

371001–371100 

|-bgcolor=#E9E9E9
| 371001 ||  || — || August 30, 2005 || Kitt Peak || Spacewatch || — || align=right data-sort-value="0.79" | 790 m || 
|-id=002 bgcolor=#E9E9E9
| 371002 ||  || — || October 4, 2005 || Mount Lemmon || Mount Lemmon Survey || — || align=right data-sort-value="0.60" | 600 m || 
|-id=003 bgcolor=#E9E9E9
| 371003 ||  || — || October 7, 2005 || Kitt Peak || Spacewatch || — || align=right data-sort-value="0.73" | 730 m || 
|-id=004 bgcolor=#E9E9E9
| 371004 ||  || — || October 7, 2005 || Kitt Peak || Spacewatch || — || align=right | 1.5 km || 
|-id=005 bgcolor=#E9E9E9
| 371005 ||  || — || October 7, 2005 || Catalina || CSS || — || align=right | 1.3 km || 
|-id=006 bgcolor=#E9E9E9
| 371006 ||  || — || September 29, 2005 || Kitt Peak || Spacewatch || — || align=right | 2.1 km || 
|-id=007 bgcolor=#E9E9E9
| 371007 ||  || — || October 9, 2005 || Kitt Peak || Spacewatch || — || align=right data-sort-value="0.55" | 550 m || 
|-id=008 bgcolor=#E9E9E9
| 371008 ||  || — || October 9, 2005 || Kitt Peak || Spacewatch || — || align=right data-sort-value="0.90" | 900 m || 
|-id=009 bgcolor=#E9E9E9
| 371009 ||  || — || October 10, 2005 || Kitt Peak || Spacewatch || — || align=right data-sort-value="0.92" | 920 m || 
|-id=010 bgcolor=#E9E9E9
| 371010 ||  || — || October 1, 2005 || Kitt Peak || Spacewatch || — || align=right data-sort-value="0.83" | 830 m || 
|-id=011 bgcolor=#E9E9E9
| 371011 ||  || — || October 1, 2005 || Kitt Peak || Spacewatch || — || align=right | 1.2 km || 
|-id=012 bgcolor=#E9E9E9
| 371012 ||  || — || October 22, 2005 || Kitt Peak || Spacewatch || — || align=right data-sort-value="0.91" | 910 m || 
|-id=013 bgcolor=#E9E9E9
| 371013 ||  || — || October 22, 2005 || Kitt Peak || Spacewatch || ADE || align=right | 2.2 km || 
|-id=014 bgcolor=#E9E9E9
| 371014 ||  || — || October 23, 2005 || Kitt Peak || Spacewatch || — || align=right | 1.1 km || 
|-id=015 bgcolor=#E9E9E9
| 371015 ||  || — || October 23, 2005 || Catalina || CSS || — || align=right data-sort-value="0.83" | 830 m || 
|-id=016 bgcolor=#E9E9E9
| 371016 ||  || — || October 24, 2005 || Kitt Peak || Spacewatch || — || align=right | 1.3 km || 
|-id=017 bgcolor=#E9E9E9
| 371017 ||  || — || October 24, 2005 || Kitt Peak || Spacewatch || — || align=right | 1.1 km || 
|-id=018 bgcolor=#E9E9E9
| 371018 ||  || — || October 22, 2005 || Kitt Peak || Spacewatch || — || align=right | 1.4 km || 
|-id=019 bgcolor=#E9E9E9
| 371019 ||  || — || October 23, 2005 || Catalina || CSS || — || align=right | 1.2 km || 
|-id=020 bgcolor=#E9E9E9
| 371020 ||  || — || October 24, 2005 || Kitt Peak || Spacewatch || HEN || align=right data-sort-value="0.78" | 780 m || 
|-id=021 bgcolor=#E9E9E9
| 371021 ||  || — || October 25, 2005 || Mount Lemmon || Mount Lemmon Survey || — || align=right | 1.3 km || 
|-id=022 bgcolor=#E9E9E9
| 371022 ||  || — || October 25, 2005 || Mount Lemmon || Mount Lemmon Survey || — || align=right | 1.3 km || 
|-id=023 bgcolor=#E9E9E9
| 371023 ||  || — || September 29, 2005 || Catalina || CSS || — || align=right | 1.5 km || 
|-id=024 bgcolor=#E9E9E9
| 371024 ||  || — || October 22, 2005 || Kitt Peak || Spacewatch || — || align=right | 1.2 km || 
|-id=025 bgcolor=#fefefe
| 371025 ||  || — || October 23, 2005 || Catalina || CSS || H || align=right data-sort-value="0.97" | 970 m || 
|-id=026 bgcolor=#E9E9E9
| 371026 ||  || — || October 24, 2005 || Palomar || NEAT || EUN || align=right | 1.5 km || 
|-id=027 bgcolor=#E9E9E9
| 371027 ||  || — || October 25, 2005 || Mount Lemmon || Mount Lemmon Survey || — || align=right | 1.2 km || 
|-id=028 bgcolor=#E9E9E9
| 371028 ||  || — || October 22, 2005 || Kitt Peak || Spacewatch || — || align=right | 1.6 km || 
|-id=029 bgcolor=#E9E9E9
| 371029 ||  || — || October 22, 2005 || Kitt Peak || Spacewatch || — || align=right | 1.3 km || 
|-id=030 bgcolor=#E9E9E9
| 371030 ||  || — || October 22, 2005 || Kitt Peak || Spacewatch || — || align=right | 1.0 km || 
|-id=031 bgcolor=#E9E9E9
| 371031 ||  || — || October 22, 2005 || Kitt Peak || Spacewatch || — || align=right | 1.2 km || 
|-id=032 bgcolor=#E9E9E9
| 371032 ||  || — || October 22, 2005 || Kitt Peak || Spacewatch || — || align=right | 1.3 km || 
|-id=033 bgcolor=#E9E9E9
| 371033 ||  || — || October 22, 2005 || Kitt Peak || Spacewatch || — || align=right | 1.8 km || 
|-id=034 bgcolor=#E9E9E9
| 371034 ||  || — || October 22, 2005 || Catalina || CSS || — || align=right | 1.1 km || 
|-id=035 bgcolor=#E9E9E9
| 371035 ||  || — || October 26, 2005 || Kitt Peak || Spacewatch || — || align=right | 1.2 km || 
|-id=036 bgcolor=#E9E9E9
| 371036 ||  || — || October 26, 2005 || Kitt Peak || Spacewatch || — || align=right | 1.1 km || 
|-id=037 bgcolor=#E9E9E9
| 371037 ||  || — || October 26, 2005 || Kitt Peak || Spacewatch || — || align=right | 3.0 km || 
|-id=038 bgcolor=#E9E9E9
| 371038 ||  || — || October 26, 2005 || Kitt Peak || Spacewatch || — || align=right | 1.5 km || 
|-id=039 bgcolor=#E9E9E9
| 371039 ||  || — || October 26, 2005 || Kitt Peak || Spacewatch || — || align=right | 1.6 km || 
|-id=040 bgcolor=#E9E9E9
| 371040 ||  || — || October 22, 2005 || Palomar || NEAT || — || align=right data-sort-value="0.98" | 980 m || 
|-id=041 bgcolor=#E9E9E9
| 371041 ||  || — || October 23, 2005 || Kitt Peak || Spacewatch || — || align=right data-sort-value="0.99" | 990 m || 
|-id=042 bgcolor=#E9E9E9
| 371042 ||  || — || October 27, 2005 || Anderson Mesa || LONEOS || — || align=right data-sort-value="0.98" | 980 m || 
|-id=043 bgcolor=#E9E9E9
| 371043 ||  || — || October 23, 2005 || Kitt Peak || Spacewatch || — || align=right data-sort-value="0.90" | 900 m || 
|-id=044 bgcolor=#E9E9E9
| 371044 ||  || — || October 23, 2005 || Kitt Peak || Spacewatch || — || align=right data-sort-value="0.87" | 870 m || 
|-id=045 bgcolor=#E9E9E9
| 371045 ||  || — || October 24, 2005 || Kitt Peak || Spacewatch || — || align=right | 1.6 km || 
|-id=046 bgcolor=#E9E9E9
| 371046 ||  || — || October 24, 2005 || Kitt Peak || Spacewatch || — || align=right | 2.1 km || 
|-id=047 bgcolor=#E9E9E9
| 371047 ||  || — || October 24, 2005 || Kitt Peak || Spacewatch || — || align=right | 1.9 km || 
|-id=048 bgcolor=#E9E9E9
| 371048 ||  || — || October 24, 2005 || Kitt Peak || Spacewatch || — || align=right | 1.8 km || 
|-id=049 bgcolor=#E9E9E9
| 371049 ||  || — || October 26, 2005 || Kitt Peak || Spacewatch || — || align=right | 1.2 km || 
|-id=050 bgcolor=#E9E9E9
| 371050 ||  || — || October 25, 2005 || Kitt Peak || Spacewatch || — || align=right | 1.2 km || 
|-id=051 bgcolor=#E9E9E9
| 371051 ||  || — || October 25, 2005 || Kitt Peak || Spacewatch || — || align=right | 1.4 km || 
|-id=052 bgcolor=#E9E9E9
| 371052 ||  || — || October 25, 2005 || Catalina || CSS || — || align=right | 1.2 km || 
|-id=053 bgcolor=#E9E9E9
| 371053 ||  || — || October 22, 2005 || Kitt Peak || Spacewatch || — || align=right | 1.2 km || 
|-id=054 bgcolor=#E9E9E9
| 371054 ||  || — || October 25, 2005 || Kitt Peak || Spacewatch || — || align=right | 1.6 km || 
|-id=055 bgcolor=#E9E9E9
| 371055 ||  || — || October 25, 2005 || Kitt Peak || Spacewatch || — || align=right | 1.3 km || 
|-id=056 bgcolor=#E9E9E9
| 371056 ||  || — || October 25, 2005 || Kitt Peak || Spacewatch || — || align=right | 1.4 km || 
|-id=057 bgcolor=#E9E9E9
| 371057 ||  || — || October 25, 2005 || Kitt Peak || Spacewatch || — || align=right data-sort-value="0.95" | 950 m || 
|-id=058 bgcolor=#E9E9E9
| 371058 ||  || — || October 25, 2005 || Kitt Peak || Spacewatch || — || align=right data-sort-value="0.80" | 800 m || 
|-id=059 bgcolor=#E9E9E9
| 371059 ||  || — || October 25, 2005 || Kitt Peak || Spacewatch || JUN || align=right | 1.6 km || 
|-id=060 bgcolor=#E9E9E9
| 371060 ||  || — || October 28, 2005 || Mount Lemmon || Mount Lemmon Survey || — || align=right | 1.9 km || 
|-id=061 bgcolor=#E9E9E9
| 371061 ||  || — || October 28, 2005 || Mount Lemmon || Mount Lemmon Survey || — || align=right | 1.9 km || 
|-id=062 bgcolor=#E9E9E9
| 371062 ||  || — || October 24, 2005 || Kitt Peak || Spacewatch || — || align=right data-sort-value="0.97" | 970 m || 
|-id=063 bgcolor=#E9E9E9
| 371063 ||  || — || October 26, 2005 || Palomar || NEAT || — || align=right | 2.0 km || 
|-id=064 bgcolor=#E9E9E9
| 371064 ||  || — || October 25, 2005 || Kitt Peak || Spacewatch || — || align=right | 1.0 km || 
|-id=065 bgcolor=#E9E9E9
| 371065 ||  || — || October 25, 2005 || Mount Lemmon || Mount Lemmon Survey || — || align=right | 1.3 km || 
|-id=066 bgcolor=#E9E9E9
| 371066 ||  || — || October 25, 2005 || Mount Lemmon || Mount Lemmon Survey || — || align=right | 2.2 km || 
|-id=067 bgcolor=#E9E9E9
| 371067 ||  || — || October 24, 2005 || Kitt Peak || Spacewatch || — || align=right | 1.1 km || 
|-id=068 bgcolor=#E9E9E9
| 371068 ||  || — || October 24, 2005 || Kitt Peak || Spacewatch || — || align=right data-sort-value="0.89" | 890 m || 
|-id=069 bgcolor=#E9E9E9
| 371069 ||  || — || October 24, 2005 || Kitt Peak || Spacewatch || — || align=right | 1.8 km || 
|-id=070 bgcolor=#E9E9E9
| 371070 ||  || — || October 25, 2005 || Mount Lemmon || Mount Lemmon Survey || — || align=right | 1.2 km || 
|-id=071 bgcolor=#E9E9E9
| 371071 ||  || — || October 26, 2005 || Kitt Peak || Spacewatch || — || align=right data-sort-value="0.87" | 870 m || 
|-id=072 bgcolor=#E9E9E9
| 371072 ||  || — || October 26, 2005 || Kitt Peak || Spacewatch || — || align=right | 1.2 km || 
|-id=073 bgcolor=#E9E9E9
| 371073 ||  || — || October 27, 2005 || Mount Lemmon || Mount Lemmon Survey || — || align=right | 1.8 km || 
|-id=074 bgcolor=#E9E9E9
| 371074 ||  || — || October 27, 2005 || Mount Lemmon || Mount Lemmon Survey || HEN || align=right data-sort-value="0.87" | 870 m || 
|-id=075 bgcolor=#E9E9E9
| 371075 ||  || — || October 29, 2005 || Kitt Peak || Spacewatch || — || align=right | 1.9 km || 
|-id=076 bgcolor=#E9E9E9
| 371076 ||  || — || October 29, 2005 || Kitt Peak || Spacewatch || — || align=right | 2.1 km || 
|-id=077 bgcolor=#E9E9E9
| 371077 ||  || — || October 29, 2005 || Mount Lemmon || Mount Lemmon Survey || — || align=right | 1.9 km || 
|-id=078 bgcolor=#fefefe
| 371078 ||  || — || October 27, 2005 || Mount Lemmon || Mount Lemmon Survey || H || align=right data-sort-value="0.55" | 550 m || 
|-id=079 bgcolor=#E9E9E9
| 371079 ||  || — || October 29, 2005 || Catalina || CSS || — || align=right | 2.0 km || 
|-id=080 bgcolor=#E9E9E9
| 371080 ||  || — || October 27, 2005 || Kitt Peak || Spacewatch || — || align=right | 1.3 km || 
|-id=081 bgcolor=#E9E9E9
| 371081 ||  || — || October 27, 2005 || Kitt Peak || Spacewatch || — || align=right | 1.3 km || 
|-id=082 bgcolor=#E9E9E9
| 371082 ||  || — || October 27, 2005 || Catalina || CSS || ADE || align=right | 2.7 km || 
|-id=083 bgcolor=#E9E9E9
| 371083 ||  || — || October 26, 2005 || Kitt Peak || Spacewatch || — || align=right | 1.3 km || 
|-id=084 bgcolor=#E9E9E9
| 371084 ||  || — || October 29, 2005 || Mount Lemmon || Mount Lemmon Survey || — || align=right | 1.2 km || 
|-id=085 bgcolor=#E9E9E9
| 371085 ||  || — || October 27, 2005 || Catalina || CSS || JUN || align=right | 1.0 km || 
|-id=086 bgcolor=#E9E9E9
| 371086 ||  || — || October 26, 2005 || Kitt Peak || Spacewatch || — || align=right | 1.1 km || 
|-id=087 bgcolor=#E9E9E9
| 371087 ||  || — || October 26, 2005 || Kitt Peak || Spacewatch || — || align=right | 1.5 km || 
|-id=088 bgcolor=#E9E9E9
| 371088 ||  || — || October 22, 2005 || Kitt Peak || Spacewatch || — || align=right | 1.4 km || 
|-id=089 bgcolor=#E9E9E9
| 371089 ||  || — || October 30, 2005 || Socorro || LINEAR || — || align=right | 1.1 km || 
|-id=090 bgcolor=#E9E9E9
| 371090 ||  || — || October 30, 2005 || Socorro || LINEAR || — || align=right | 1.2 km || 
|-id=091 bgcolor=#E9E9E9
| 371091 ||  || — || October 30, 2005 || Socorro || LINEAR || HNS || align=right | 1.8 km || 
|-id=092 bgcolor=#FA8072
| 371092 ||  || — || October 30, 2005 || Palomar || NEAT || — || align=right | 1.5 km || 
|-id=093 bgcolor=#E9E9E9
| 371093 ||  || — || October 30, 2005 || Kitt Peak || Spacewatch || — || align=right data-sort-value="0.68" | 680 m || 
|-id=094 bgcolor=#E9E9E9
| 371094 ||  || — || October 30, 2005 || Kitt Peak || Spacewatch || — || align=right | 1.2 km || 
|-id=095 bgcolor=#E9E9E9
| 371095 ||  || — || October 30, 2005 || Kitt Peak || Spacewatch || — || align=right | 2.2 km || 
|-id=096 bgcolor=#E9E9E9
| 371096 ||  || — || October 22, 2005 || Kitt Peak || Spacewatch || GER || align=right | 1.3 km || 
|-id=097 bgcolor=#E9E9E9
| 371097 ||  || — || October 22, 2005 || Kitt Peak || Spacewatch || — || align=right data-sort-value="0.87" | 870 m || 
|-id=098 bgcolor=#E9E9E9
| 371098 ||  || — || October 25, 2005 || Mount Lemmon || Mount Lemmon Survey || — || align=right data-sort-value="0.73" | 730 m || 
|-id=099 bgcolor=#E9E9E9
| 371099 ||  || — || October 30, 2005 || Mount Lemmon || Mount Lemmon Survey || — || align=right | 1.3 km || 
|-id=100 bgcolor=#E9E9E9
| 371100 ||  || — || October 26, 2005 || Apache Point || A. C. Becker || — || align=right data-sort-value="0.98" | 980 m || 
|}

371101–371200 

|-bgcolor=#E9E9E9
| 371101 ||  || — || November 6, 2005 || Mount Lemmon || Mount Lemmon Survey || — || align=right data-sort-value="0.84" | 840 m || 
|-id=102 bgcolor=#E9E9E9
| 371102 ||  || — || November 13, 2005 || Desert Moon || B. L. Stevens || — || align=right | 1.1 km || 
|-id=103 bgcolor=#E9E9E9
| 371103 ||  || — || November 1, 2005 || Catalina || CSS || — || align=right | 1.6 km || 
|-id=104 bgcolor=#E9E9E9
| 371104 ||  || — || October 3, 2005 || Kitt Peak || Spacewatch || — || align=right data-sort-value="0.89" | 890 m || 
|-id=105 bgcolor=#d6d6d6
| 371105 ||  || — || November 3, 2005 || Mount Lemmon || Mount Lemmon Survey || SHU3:2 || align=right | 6.6 km || 
|-id=106 bgcolor=#E9E9E9
| 371106 ||  || — || November 3, 2005 || Catalina || CSS || KON || align=right | 1.9 km || 
|-id=107 bgcolor=#E9E9E9
| 371107 ||  || — || November 5, 2005 || Kitt Peak || Spacewatch || — || align=right data-sort-value="0.83" | 830 m || 
|-id=108 bgcolor=#E9E9E9
| 371108 ||  || — || November 5, 2005 || Catalina || CSS || — || align=right | 1.2 km || 
|-id=109 bgcolor=#E9E9E9
| 371109 ||  || — || November 1, 2005 || Mount Lemmon || Mount Lemmon Survey || — || align=right | 1.0 km || 
|-id=110 bgcolor=#E9E9E9
| 371110 ||  || — || November 1, 2005 || Mount Lemmon || Mount Lemmon Survey || — || align=right data-sort-value="0.75" | 750 m || 
|-id=111 bgcolor=#E9E9E9
| 371111 ||  || — || November 6, 2005 || Kitt Peak || Spacewatch || HEN || align=right | 1.0 km || 
|-id=112 bgcolor=#E9E9E9
| 371112 ||  || — || October 25, 2005 || Kitt Peak || Spacewatch || — || align=right | 1.6 km || 
|-id=113 bgcolor=#E9E9E9
| 371113 ||  || — || November 6, 2005 || Kitt Peak || Spacewatch || — || align=right | 1.3 km || 
|-id=114 bgcolor=#E9E9E9
| 371114 ||  || — || October 29, 2005 || Kitt Peak || Spacewatch || — || align=right | 1.5 km || 
|-id=115 bgcolor=#E9E9E9
| 371115 ||  || — || November 10, 2005 || Catalina || CSS || EUN || align=right | 1.7 km || 
|-id=116 bgcolor=#E9E9E9
| 371116 ||  || — || November 1, 2005 || Kitt Peak || Spacewatch || — || align=right | 1.2 km || 
|-id=117 bgcolor=#E9E9E9
| 371117 ||  || — || November 5, 2005 || Kitt Peak || Spacewatch || — || align=right data-sort-value="0.83" | 830 m || 
|-id=118 bgcolor=#E9E9E9
| 371118 ||  || — || November 6, 2005 || Mount Lemmon || Mount Lemmon Survey || — || align=right | 1.2 km || 
|-id=119 bgcolor=#E9E9E9
| 371119 ||  || — || November 10, 2005 || Mount Lemmon || Mount Lemmon Survey || EUN || align=right | 1.9 km || 
|-id=120 bgcolor=#E9E9E9
| 371120 ||  || — || November 1, 2005 || Apache Point || A. C. Becker || — || align=right | 1.0 km || 
|-id=121 bgcolor=#E9E9E9
| 371121 ||  || — || November 24, 2005 || Palomar || NEAT || — || align=right data-sort-value="0.82" | 820 m || 
|-id=122 bgcolor=#E9E9E9
| 371122 ||  || — || November 21, 2005 || Kitt Peak || Spacewatch || — || align=right | 1.3 km || 
|-id=123 bgcolor=#E9E9E9
| 371123 ||  || — || November 21, 2005 || Kitt Peak || Spacewatch || — || align=right | 1.5 km || 
|-id=124 bgcolor=#E9E9E9
| 371124 ||  || — || November 21, 2005 || Kitt Peak || Spacewatch || — || align=right | 1.9 km || 
|-id=125 bgcolor=#E9E9E9
| 371125 ||  || — || November 22, 2005 || Kitt Peak || Spacewatch || — || align=right | 1.4 km || 
|-id=126 bgcolor=#E9E9E9
| 371126 ||  || — || November 22, 2005 || Kitt Peak || Spacewatch || — || align=right | 1.3 km || 
|-id=127 bgcolor=#E9E9E9
| 371127 ||  || — || November 25, 2005 || Mount Lemmon || Mount Lemmon Survey || — || align=right | 1.3 km || 
|-id=128 bgcolor=#E9E9E9
| 371128 ||  || — || November 25, 2005 || Catalina || CSS || — || align=right | 1.6 km || 
|-id=129 bgcolor=#E9E9E9
| 371129 ||  || — || November 25, 2005 || Catalina || CSS || — || align=right | 1.5 km || 
|-id=130 bgcolor=#E9E9E9
| 371130 ||  || — || November 25, 2005 || Kitt Peak || Spacewatch || — || align=right | 1.8 km || 
|-id=131 bgcolor=#E9E9E9
| 371131 ||  || — || November 25, 2005 || Kitt Peak || Spacewatch || — || align=right | 1.7 km || 
|-id=132 bgcolor=#E9E9E9
| 371132 ||  || — || November 26, 2005 || Kitt Peak || Spacewatch || — || align=right | 1.5 km || 
|-id=133 bgcolor=#E9E9E9
| 371133 ||  || — || November 26, 2005 || Kitt Peak || Spacewatch || — || align=right | 1.2 km || 
|-id=134 bgcolor=#E9E9E9
| 371134 ||  || — || November 28, 2005 || Catalina || CSS || ADE || align=right | 2.8 km || 
|-id=135 bgcolor=#E9E9E9
| 371135 ||  || — || November 28, 2005 || Catalina || CSS || BRG || align=right | 1.9 km || 
|-id=136 bgcolor=#E9E9E9
| 371136 ||  || — || November 30, 2005 || Socorro || LINEAR || — || align=right | 2.7 km || 
|-id=137 bgcolor=#E9E9E9
| 371137 ||  || — || November 30, 2005 || Kitt Peak || Spacewatch || — || align=right | 1.5 km || 
|-id=138 bgcolor=#E9E9E9
| 371138 ||  || — || November 25, 2005 || Mount Lemmon || Mount Lemmon Survey || — || align=right | 1.2 km || 
|-id=139 bgcolor=#E9E9E9
| 371139 ||  || — || November 25, 2005 || Mount Lemmon || Mount Lemmon Survey || — || align=right | 1.3 km || 
|-id=140 bgcolor=#E9E9E9
| 371140 ||  || — || November 25, 2005 || Mount Lemmon || Mount Lemmon Survey || — || align=right | 1.8 km || 
|-id=141 bgcolor=#E9E9E9
| 371141 ||  || — || November 28, 2005 || Kitt Peak || Spacewatch || — || align=right | 1.2 km || 
|-id=142 bgcolor=#E9E9E9
| 371142 ||  || — || November 29, 2005 || Kitt Peak || Spacewatch || WIT || align=right | 1.0 km || 
|-id=143 bgcolor=#E9E9E9
| 371143 ||  || — || November 30, 2005 || Mount Lemmon || Mount Lemmon Survey || AEO || align=right | 1.2 km || 
|-id=144 bgcolor=#E9E9E9
| 371144 ||  || — || November 30, 2005 || Kitt Peak || Spacewatch || AGN || align=right data-sort-value="0.92" | 920 m || 
|-id=145 bgcolor=#E9E9E9
| 371145 ||  || — || November 30, 2005 || Kitt Peak || Spacewatch || — || align=right | 1.2 km || 
|-id=146 bgcolor=#E9E9E9
| 371146 ||  || — || December 2, 2005 || Mount Lemmon || Mount Lemmon Survey || — || align=right | 1.4 km || 
|-id=147 bgcolor=#E9E9E9
| 371147 ||  || — || December 2, 2005 || Mount Lemmon || Mount Lemmon Survey || — || align=right | 2.2 km || 
|-id=148 bgcolor=#E9E9E9
| 371148 ||  || — || December 4, 2005 || Kitt Peak || Spacewatch || — || align=right | 1.2 km || 
|-id=149 bgcolor=#E9E9E9
| 371149 ||  || — || December 4, 2005 || Kitt Peak || Spacewatch || — || align=right | 1.4 km || 
|-id=150 bgcolor=#E9E9E9
| 371150 ||  || — || November 30, 2005 || Kitt Peak || Spacewatch || WIT || align=right data-sort-value="0.91" | 910 m || 
|-id=151 bgcolor=#E9E9E9
| 371151 ||  || — || December 2, 2005 || Kitt Peak || Spacewatch || — || align=right | 1.8 km || 
|-id=152 bgcolor=#E9E9E9
| 371152 ||  || — || December 2, 2005 || Mount Lemmon || Mount Lemmon Survey || — || align=right | 1.4 km || 
|-id=153 bgcolor=#E9E9E9
| 371153 ||  || — || December 5, 2005 || Kitt Peak || Spacewatch || — || align=right | 1.2 km || 
|-id=154 bgcolor=#E9E9E9
| 371154 ||  || — || December 7, 2005 || Kitt Peak || Spacewatch || — || align=right | 1.9 km || 
|-id=155 bgcolor=#E9E9E9
| 371155 ||  || — || December 6, 2005 || Kitt Peak || Spacewatch || — || align=right | 1.9 km || 
|-id=156 bgcolor=#E9E9E9
| 371156 ||  || — || December 6, 2005 || Kitt Peak || Spacewatch || — || align=right | 1.4 km || 
|-id=157 bgcolor=#E9E9E9
| 371157 ||  || — || December 6, 2005 || Kitt Peak || Spacewatch || — || align=right | 1.7 km || 
|-id=158 bgcolor=#E9E9E9
| 371158 ||  || — || December 1, 2005 || Anderson Mesa || LONEOS || — || align=right | 2.2 km || 
|-id=159 bgcolor=#d6d6d6
| 371159 ||  || — || December 1, 2005 || Kitt Peak || M. W. Buie || CHA || align=right | 1.9 km || 
|-id=160 bgcolor=#E9E9E9
| 371160 ||  || — || December 1, 2005 || Kitt Peak || M. W. Buie || — || align=right | 2.3 km || 
|-id=161 bgcolor=#E9E9E9
| 371161 ||  || — || December 22, 2005 || Kitt Peak || Spacewatch || — || align=right | 2.0 km || 
|-id=162 bgcolor=#E9E9E9
| 371162 ||  || — || November 6, 2005 || Mount Lemmon || Mount Lemmon Survey || — || align=right | 1.5 km || 
|-id=163 bgcolor=#E9E9E9
| 371163 ||  || — || December 24, 2005 || Kitt Peak || Spacewatch || — || align=right | 1.3 km || 
|-id=164 bgcolor=#E9E9E9
| 371164 ||  || — || December 24, 2005 || Kitt Peak || Spacewatch || — || align=right | 1.7 km || 
|-id=165 bgcolor=#E9E9E9
| 371165 ||  || — || December 21, 2005 || Kitt Peak || Spacewatch || — || align=right | 1.4 km || 
|-id=166 bgcolor=#E9E9E9
| 371166 ||  || — || December 22, 2005 || Kitt Peak || Spacewatch || MAR || align=right | 1.4 km || 
|-id=167 bgcolor=#E9E9E9
| 371167 ||  || — || December 22, 2005 || Kitt Peak || Spacewatch || — || align=right | 1.6 km || 
|-id=168 bgcolor=#E9E9E9
| 371168 ||  || — || December 24, 2005 || Kitt Peak || Spacewatch || — || align=right | 1.6 km || 
|-id=169 bgcolor=#E9E9E9
| 371169 ||  || — || December 24, 2005 || Kitt Peak || Spacewatch || AEO || align=right | 1.1 km || 
|-id=170 bgcolor=#E9E9E9
| 371170 ||  || — || December 22, 2005 || Kitt Peak || Spacewatch || — || align=right | 2.0 km || 
|-id=171 bgcolor=#E9E9E9
| 371171 ||  || — || December 24, 2005 || Kitt Peak || Spacewatch || — || align=right | 1.6 km || 
|-id=172 bgcolor=#E9E9E9
| 371172 ||  || — || December 22, 2005 || Kitt Peak || Spacewatch || — || align=right | 2.0 km || 
|-id=173 bgcolor=#E9E9E9
| 371173 ||  || — || December 22, 2005 || Kitt Peak || Spacewatch || PAD || align=right | 1.7 km || 
|-id=174 bgcolor=#E9E9E9
| 371174 ||  || — || December 25, 2005 || Kitt Peak || Spacewatch || — || align=right | 2.1 km || 
|-id=175 bgcolor=#E9E9E9
| 371175 ||  || — || December 24, 2005 || Kitt Peak || Spacewatch || — || align=right | 2.1 km || 
|-id=176 bgcolor=#E9E9E9
| 371176 ||  || — || December 24, 2005 || Kitt Peak || Spacewatch || — || align=right | 2.5 km || 
|-id=177 bgcolor=#E9E9E9
| 371177 ||  || — || December 24, 2005 || Kitt Peak || Spacewatch || — || align=right | 2.6 km || 
|-id=178 bgcolor=#E9E9E9
| 371178 ||  || — || December 24, 2005 || Kitt Peak || Spacewatch || WIT || align=right | 1.2 km || 
|-id=179 bgcolor=#E9E9E9
| 371179 ||  || — || December 25, 2005 || Mount Lemmon || Mount Lemmon Survey || — || align=right | 1.9 km || 
|-id=180 bgcolor=#E9E9E9
| 371180 ||  || — || December 25, 2005 || Mount Lemmon || Mount Lemmon Survey || — || align=right | 2.7 km || 
|-id=181 bgcolor=#E9E9E9
| 371181 ||  || — || December 25, 2005 || Mount Lemmon || Mount Lemmon Survey || HEN || align=right | 1.2 km || 
|-id=182 bgcolor=#E9E9E9
| 371182 ||  || — || December 26, 2005 || Mount Lemmon || Mount Lemmon Survey || — || align=right | 2.0 km || 
|-id=183 bgcolor=#E9E9E9
| 371183 ||  || — || December 25, 2005 || Kitt Peak || Spacewatch || GEF || align=right | 1.2 km || 
|-id=184 bgcolor=#E9E9E9
| 371184 ||  || — || December 25, 2005 || Kitt Peak || Spacewatch || PAD || align=right | 1.9 km || 
|-id=185 bgcolor=#E9E9E9
| 371185 ||  || — || December 25, 2005 || Mount Lemmon || Mount Lemmon Survey || — || align=right | 2.3 km || 
|-id=186 bgcolor=#E9E9E9
| 371186 ||  || — || December 25, 2005 || Kitt Peak || Spacewatch || AGN || align=right | 1.2 km || 
|-id=187 bgcolor=#E9E9E9
| 371187 ||  || — || December 10, 2005 || Kitt Peak || Spacewatch || AGN || align=right | 1.2 km || 
|-id=188 bgcolor=#d6d6d6
| 371188 ||  || — || December 25, 2005 || Kitt Peak || Spacewatch || KAR || align=right | 1.3 km || 
|-id=189 bgcolor=#d6d6d6
| 371189 ||  || — || December 26, 2005 || Kitt Peak || Spacewatch || — || align=right | 2.4 km || 
|-id=190 bgcolor=#E9E9E9
| 371190 ||  || — || December 26, 2005 || Catalina || CSS || — || align=right | 2.2 km || 
|-id=191 bgcolor=#E9E9E9
| 371191 ||  || — || December 27, 2005 || Mount Lemmon || Mount Lemmon Survey || — || align=right | 2.2 km || 
|-id=192 bgcolor=#E9E9E9
| 371192 ||  || — || December 26, 2005 || Kitt Peak || Spacewatch || — || align=right | 2.5 km || 
|-id=193 bgcolor=#E9E9E9
| 371193 ||  || — || November 30, 2005 || Kitt Peak || Spacewatch || — || align=right | 1.9 km || 
|-id=194 bgcolor=#E9E9E9
| 371194 ||  || — || December 29, 2005 || Mount Lemmon || Mount Lemmon Survey || HEN || align=right | 1.2 km || 
|-id=195 bgcolor=#E9E9E9
| 371195 ||  || — || December 25, 2005 || Kitt Peak || Spacewatch || — || align=right | 1.6 km || 
|-id=196 bgcolor=#E9E9E9
| 371196 ||  || — || December 29, 2005 || Socorro || LINEAR || — || align=right | 2.7 km || 
|-id=197 bgcolor=#E9E9E9
| 371197 ||  || — || December 27, 2005 || Kitt Peak || Spacewatch || — || align=right | 1.6 km || 
|-id=198 bgcolor=#E9E9E9
| 371198 ||  || — || December 27, 2005 || Socorro || LINEAR || JUN || align=right | 1.6 km || 
|-id=199 bgcolor=#E9E9E9
| 371199 ||  || — || December 22, 2005 || Kitt Peak || Spacewatch || — || align=right | 1.5 km || 
|-id=200 bgcolor=#E9E9E9
| 371200 ||  || — || November 29, 2005 || Mount Lemmon || Mount Lemmon Survey || WIT || align=right | 1.1 km || 
|}

371201–371300 

|-bgcolor=#E9E9E9
| 371201 ||  || — || December 21, 2005 || Catalina || CSS || — || align=right | 1.1 km || 
|-id=202 bgcolor=#E9E9E9
| 371202 ||  || — || December 29, 2005 || Socorro || LINEAR || — || align=right | 1.7 km || 
|-id=203 bgcolor=#C2FFFF
| 371203 ||  || — || December 28, 2005 || Mount Lemmon || Mount Lemmon Survey || L5 || align=right | 9.0 km || 
|-id=204 bgcolor=#E9E9E9
| 371204 ||  || — || January 5, 2006 || Catalina || CSS || — || align=right | 2.1 km || 
|-id=205 bgcolor=#E9E9E9
| 371205 ||  || — || January 2, 2006 || Mount Lemmon || Mount Lemmon Survey || WIT || align=right | 1.2 km || 
|-id=206 bgcolor=#E9E9E9
| 371206 ||  || — || January 7, 2006 || Mount Lemmon || Mount Lemmon Survey || — || align=right | 2.0 km || 
|-id=207 bgcolor=#E9E9E9
| 371207 ||  || — || January 7, 2006 || Kitt Peak || Spacewatch || — || align=right | 1.9 km || 
|-id=208 bgcolor=#E9E9E9
| 371208 ||  || — || December 29, 2005 || Kitt Peak || Spacewatch || — || align=right | 2.5 km || 
|-id=209 bgcolor=#E9E9E9
| 371209 ||  || — || January 5, 2006 || Kitt Peak || Spacewatch || HOF || align=right | 2.4 km || 
|-id=210 bgcolor=#E9E9E9
| 371210 ||  || — || January 5, 2006 || Kitt Peak || Spacewatch || — || align=right | 3.1 km || 
|-id=211 bgcolor=#E9E9E9
| 371211 ||  || — || January 5, 2006 || Kitt Peak || Spacewatch || AGN || align=right data-sort-value="0.91" | 910 m || 
|-id=212 bgcolor=#E9E9E9
| 371212 ||  || — || January 9, 2006 || Kitt Peak || Spacewatch || HOF || align=right | 2.5 km || 
|-id=213 bgcolor=#E9E9E9
| 371213 ||  || — || January 4, 2006 || Mount Lemmon || Mount Lemmon Survey || HOF || align=right | 2.5 km || 
|-id=214 bgcolor=#E9E9E9
| 371214 ||  || — || January 7, 2006 || Mount Lemmon || Mount Lemmon Survey || GEF || align=right | 1.6 km || 
|-id=215 bgcolor=#E9E9E9
| 371215 ||  || — || January 7, 2006 || Mount Lemmon || Mount Lemmon Survey || — || align=right | 1.1 km || 
|-id=216 bgcolor=#E9E9E9
| 371216 ||  || — || January 7, 2006 || Kitt Peak || Spacewatch || — || align=right | 2.1 km || 
|-id=217 bgcolor=#E9E9E9
| 371217 ||  || — || January 5, 2006 || Mount Lemmon || Mount Lemmon Survey || — || align=right | 1.7 km || 
|-id=218 bgcolor=#E9E9E9
| 371218 ||  || — || January 7, 2006 || Mount Lemmon || Mount Lemmon Survey || WIT || align=right | 1.1 km || 
|-id=219 bgcolor=#E9E9E9
| 371219 ||  || — || January 8, 2006 || Mount Lemmon || Mount Lemmon Survey || WIT || align=right | 1.2 km || 
|-id=220 bgcolor=#E9E9E9
| 371220 Angers ||  ||  || January 22, 2006 || Nogales || J.-C. Merlin || — || align=right | 2.5 km || 
|-id=221 bgcolor=#E9E9E9
| 371221 ||  || — || January 21, 2006 || Kitt Peak || Spacewatch || — || align=right | 1.8 km || 
|-id=222 bgcolor=#d6d6d6
| 371222 ||  || — || January 22, 2006 || Mount Lemmon || Mount Lemmon Survey || — || align=right | 2.4 km || 
|-id=223 bgcolor=#E9E9E9
| 371223 ||  || — || January 7, 2006 || Kitt Peak || Spacewatch || HEN || align=right | 1.1 km || 
|-id=224 bgcolor=#E9E9E9
| 371224 ||  || — || January 25, 2006 || Kitt Peak || Spacewatch || — || align=right | 2.2 km || 
|-id=225 bgcolor=#E9E9E9
| 371225 ||  || — || January 25, 2006 || Kitt Peak || Spacewatch || AEO || align=right | 1.2 km || 
|-id=226 bgcolor=#d6d6d6
| 371226 ||  || — || January 25, 2006 || Kitt Peak || Spacewatch || NAE || align=right | 2.4 km || 
|-id=227 bgcolor=#d6d6d6
| 371227 ||  || — || December 28, 2005 || Mount Lemmon || Mount Lemmon Survey || — || align=right | 3.0 km || 
|-id=228 bgcolor=#E9E9E9
| 371228 ||  || — || January 24, 2006 || Socorro || LINEAR || — || align=right | 2.8 km || 
|-id=229 bgcolor=#E9E9E9
| 371229 ||  || — || January 23, 2006 || Kitt Peak || Spacewatch || AGN || align=right | 1.4 km || 
|-id=230 bgcolor=#E9E9E9
| 371230 ||  || — || January 23, 2006 || Kitt Peak || Spacewatch || — || align=right | 2.6 km || 
|-id=231 bgcolor=#d6d6d6
| 371231 ||  || — || January 23, 2006 || Kitt Peak || Spacewatch || KOR || align=right | 1.2 km || 
|-id=232 bgcolor=#d6d6d6
| 371232 ||  || — || January 23, 2006 || Kitt Peak || Spacewatch || — || align=right | 3.6 km || 
|-id=233 bgcolor=#d6d6d6
| 371233 ||  || — || January 23, 2006 || Kitt Peak || Spacewatch || — || align=right | 2.9 km || 
|-id=234 bgcolor=#E9E9E9
| 371234 ||  || — || January 25, 2006 || Kitt Peak || Spacewatch || — || align=right | 2.2 km || 
|-id=235 bgcolor=#E9E9E9
| 371235 ||  || — || January 25, 2006 || Kitt Peak || Spacewatch || — || align=right | 2.4 km || 
|-id=236 bgcolor=#d6d6d6
| 371236 ||  || — || January 25, 2006 || Kitt Peak || Spacewatch || TIR || align=right | 2.9 km || 
|-id=237 bgcolor=#d6d6d6
| 371237 ||  || — || January 26, 2006 || Kitt Peak || Spacewatch || CHA || align=right | 2.2 km || 
|-id=238 bgcolor=#d6d6d6
| 371238 ||  || — || January 26, 2006 || Mount Lemmon || Mount Lemmon Survey || — || align=right | 4.3 km || 
|-id=239 bgcolor=#E9E9E9
| 371239 ||  || — || January 26, 2006 || Mount Lemmon || Mount Lemmon Survey || AST || align=right | 1.6 km || 
|-id=240 bgcolor=#d6d6d6
| 371240 ||  || — || January 26, 2006 || Kitt Peak || Spacewatch || — || align=right | 2.8 km || 
|-id=241 bgcolor=#d6d6d6
| 371241 ||  || — || October 10, 2004 || Kitt Peak || Spacewatch || — || align=right | 2.3 km || 
|-id=242 bgcolor=#E9E9E9
| 371242 ||  || — || January 26, 2006 || Kitt Peak || Spacewatch || WIT || align=right | 1.0 km || 
|-id=243 bgcolor=#d6d6d6
| 371243 ||  || — || January 26, 2006 || Mount Lemmon || Mount Lemmon Survey || — || align=right | 2.5 km || 
|-id=244 bgcolor=#d6d6d6
| 371244 ||  || — || January 28, 2006 || Mount Lemmon || Mount Lemmon Survey || — || align=right | 2.7 km || 
|-id=245 bgcolor=#E9E9E9
| 371245 ||  || — || January 23, 2006 || Catalina || CSS || — || align=right | 2.7 km || 
|-id=246 bgcolor=#E9E9E9
| 371246 ||  || — || January 24, 2006 || Socorro || LINEAR || — || align=right | 3.7 km || 
|-id=247 bgcolor=#E9E9E9
| 371247 ||  || — || January 31, 2006 || 7300 Observatory || W. K. Y. Yeung || — || align=right | 1.7 km || 
|-id=248 bgcolor=#d6d6d6
| 371248 ||  || — || January 25, 2006 || Kitt Peak || Spacewatch || KOR || align=right | 1.5 km || 
|-id=249 bgcolor=#E9E9E9
| 371249 ||  || — || January 25, 2006 || Kitt Peak || Spacewatch || — || align=right | 2.0 km || 
|-id=250 bgcolor=#E9E9E9
| 371250 ||  || — || January 26, 2006 || Kitt Peak || Spacewatch || MRX || align=right | 1.0 km || 
|-id=251 bgcolor=#E9E9E9
| 371251 ||  || — || January 27, 2006 || Kitt Peak || Spacewatch || — || align=right | 3.3 km || 
|-id=252 bgcolor=#E9E9E9
| 371252 ||  || — || January 27, 2006 || Kitt Peak || Spacewatch || — || align=right | 2.0 km || 
|-id=253 bgcolor=#E9E9E9
| 371253 ||  || — || January 27, 2006 || Kitt Peak || Spacewatch || HOF || align=right | 3.2 km || 
|-id=254 bgcolor=#C2FFFF
| 371254 ||  || — || January 27, 2006 || Kitt Peak || Spacewatch || L5 || align=right | 7.8 km || 
|-id=255 bgcolor=#E9E9E9
| 371255 ||  || — || January 30, 2006 || Kitt Peak || Spacewatch || — || align=right | 2.2 km || 
|-id=256 bgcolor=#E9E9E9
| 371256 ||  || — || October 4, 1999 || Kitt Peak || Spacewatch || HOF || align=right | 3.5 km || 
|-id=257 bgcolor=#E9E9E9
| 371257 ||  || — || January 30, 2006 || Kitt Peak || Spacewatch || — || align=right | 2.4 km || 
|-id=258 bgcolor=#E9E9E9
| 371258 ||  || — || January 30, 2006 || Kitt Peak || Spacewatch || — || align=right | 2.2 km || 
|-id=259 bgcolor=#d6d6d6
| 371259 ||  || — || January 30, 2006 || Kitt Peak || Spacewatch || — || align=right | 2.1 km || 
|-id=260 bgcolor=#E9E9E9
| 371260 ||  || — || January 23, 2006 || Kitt Peak || Spacewatch || AGN || align=right | 1.3 km || 
|-id=261 bgcolor=#E9E9E9
| 371261 ||  || — || January 31, 2006 || Catalina || CSS || — || align=right | 2.3 km || 
|-id=262 bgcolor=#E9E9E9
| 371262 ||  || — || January 25, 2006 || Anderson Mesa || LONEOS || — || align=right | 2.3 km || 
|-id=263 bgcolor=#E9E9E9
| 371263 ||  || — || February 1, 2006 || Mount Lemmon || Mount Lemmon Survey || AGN || align=right | 1.0 km || 
|-id=264 bgcolor=#d6d6d6
| 371264 ||  || — || February 4, 2006 || Kitt Peak || Spacewatch || — || align=right | 2.7 km || 
|-id=265 bgcolor=#E9E9E9
| 371265 ||  || — || February 20, 2006 || Kitt Peak || Spacewatch || — || align=right | 2.7 km || 
|-id=266 bgcolor=#d6d6d6
| 371266 ||  || — || February 20, 2006 || Kitt Peak || Spacewatch || — || align=right | 3.8 km || 
|-id=267 bgcolor=#E9E9E9
| 371267 ||  || — || February 20, 2006 || Mount Lemmon || Mount Lemmon Survey || — || align=right | 2.7 km || 
|-id=268 bgcolor=#E9E9E9
| 371268 ||  || — || February 20, 2006 || Catalina || CSS || WIT || align=right | 1.5 km || 
|-id=269 bgcolor=#d6d6d6
| 371269 ||  || — || February 20, 2006 || Kitt Peak || Spacewatch || — || align=right | 4.0 km || 
|-id=270 bgcolor=#E9E9E9
| 371270 ||  || — || February 20, 2006 || Kitt Peak || Spacewatch || — || align=right | 2.2 km || 
|-id=271 bgcolor=#d6d6d6
| 371271 ||  || — || February 22, 2006 || Catalina || CSS || — || align=right | 3.7 km || 
|-id=272 bgcolor=#d6d6d6
| 371272 ||  || — || February 24, 2006 || Kitt Peak || Spacewatch || THM || align=right | 2.6 km || 
|-id=273 bgcolor=#d6d6d6
| 371273 ||  || — || February 24, 2006 || Kitt Peak || Spacewatch || — || align=right | 2.3 km || 
|-id=274 bgcolor=#d6d6d6
| 371274 ||  || — || February 24, 2006 || Kitt Peak || Spacewatch || — || align=right | 2.9 km || 
|-id=275 bgcolor=#fefefe
| 371275 ||  || — || February 24, 2006 || Kitt Peak || Spacewatch || — || align=right data-sort-value="0.53" | 530 m || 
|-id=276 bgcolor=#d6d6d6
| 371276 ||  || — || February 25, 2006 || Kitt Peak || Spacewatch || KOR || align=right | 1.3 km || 
|-id=277 bgcolor=#d6d6d6
| 371277 ||  || — || February 25, 2006 || Mount Lemmon || Mount Lemmon Survey || — || align=right | 2.5 km || 
|-id=278 bgcolor=#d6d6d6
| 371278 ||  || — || February 25, 2006 || Mount Lemmon || Mount Lemmon Survey || — || align=right | 2.6 km || 
|-id=279 bgcolor=#E9E9E9
| 371279 ||  || — || February 27, 2006 || Kitt Peak || Spacewatch || — || align=right | 3.1 km || 
|-id=280 bgcolor=#d6d6d6
| 371280 ||  || — || February 27, 2006 || Kitt Peak || Spacewatch || — || align=right | 3.4 km || 
|-id=281 bgcolor=#d6d6d6
| 371281 ||  || — || February 25, 2006 || Kitt Peak || Spacewatch || — || align=right | 3.1 km || 
|-id=282 bgcolor=#d6d6d6
| 371282 ||  || — || February 25, 2006 || Kitt Peak || Spacewatch || TRE || align=right | 4.5 km || 
|-id=283 bgcolor=#E9E9E9
| 371283 ||  || — || February 25, 2006 || Mount Lemmon || Mount Lemmon Survey || — || align=right | 1.9 km || 
|-id=284 bgcolor=#d6d6d6
| 371284 ||  || — || February 25, 2006 || Kitt Peak || Spacewatch || EMA || align=right | 4.3 km || 
|-id=285 bgcolor=#d6d6d6
| 371285 ||  || — || February 25, 2006 || Mount Lemmon || Mount Lemmon Survey || — || align=right | 2.5 km || 
|-id=286 bgcolor=#d6d6d6
| 371286 ||  || — || February 27, 2006 || Kitt Peak || Spacewatch || TEL || align=right | 1.3 km || 
|-id=287 bgcolor=#d6d6d6
| 371287 ||  || — || February 2, 2006 || Mount Lemmon || Mount Lemmon Survey || KOR || align=right | 1.6 km || 
|-id=288 bgcolor=#fefefe
| 371288 ||  || — || February 27, 2006 || Kitt Peak || Spacewatch || — || align=right data-sort-value="0.85" | 850 m || 
|-id=289 bgcolor=#d6d6d6
| 371289 ||  || — || February 20, 2006 || Kitt Peak || Spacewatch || HYG || align=right | 2.6 km || 
|-id=290 bgcolor=#d6d6d6
| 371290 ||  || — || February 24, 2006 || Mount Lemmon || Mount Lemmon Survey || — || align=right | 2.4 km || 
|-id=291 bgcolor=#d6d6d6
| 371291 ||  || — || October 18, 2003 || Kitt Peak || Spacewatch || — || align=right | 3.0 km || 
|-id=292 bgcolor=#d6d6d6
| 371292 ||  || — || March 2, 2006 || Kitt Peak || Spacewatch || — || align=right | 2.6 km || 
|-id=293 bgcolor=#d6d6d6
| 371293 ||  || — || March 2, 2006 || Kitt Peak || Spacewatch || — || align=right | 3.1 km || 
|-id=294 bgcolor=#d6d6d6
| 371294 ||  || — || March 3, 2006 || Kitt Peak || Spacewatch || — || align=right | 2.8 km || 
|-id=295 bgcolor=#d6d6d6
| 371295 ||  || — || March 4, 2006 || Kitt Peak || Spacewatch || EOS || align=right | 1.7 km || 
|-id=296 bgcolor=#d6d6d6
| 371296 ||  || — || March 4, 2006 || Kitt Peak || Spacewatch || — || align=right | 3.1 km || 
|-id=297 bgcolor=#d6d6d6
| 371297 ||  || — || March 5, 2006 || Kitt Peak || Spacewatch || — || align=right | 2.6 km || 
|-id=298 bgcolor=#d6d6d6
| 371298 ||  || — || March 5, 2006 || Kitt Peak || Spacewatch || — || align=right | 2.7 km || 
|-id=299 bgcolor=#d6d6d6
| 371299 ||  || — || March 3, 2006 || Kitt Peak || Spacewatch || — || align=right | 2.4 km || 
|-id=300 bgcolor=#d6d6d6
| 371300 ||  || — || March 21, 2006 || Mount Lemmon || Mount Lemmon Survey || KOR || align=right | 1.2 km || 
|}

371301–371400 

|-bgcolor=#d6d6d6
| 371301 ||  || — || March 23, 2006 || Kitt Peak || Spacewatch || — || align=right | 2.7 km || 
|-id=302 bgcolor=#E9E9E9
| 371302 ||  || — || February 22, 2006 || Catalina || CSS || — || align=right | 3.6 km || 
|-id=303 bgcolor=#d6d6d6
| 371303 ||  || — || March 19, 2006 || Socorro || LINEAR || — || align=right | 4.0 km || 
|-id=304 bgcolor=#d6d6d6
| 371304 ||  || — || March 23, 2006 || Kitt Peak || Spacewatch || — || align=right | 3.0 km || 
|-id=305 bgcolor=#fefefe
| 371305 ||  || — || March 23, 2006 || Kitt Peak || Spacewatch || — || align=right data-sort-value="0.64" | 640 m || 
|-id=306 bgcolor=#d6d6d6
| 371306 ||  || — || March 24, 2006 || Mount Lemmon || Mount Lemmon Survey || — || align=right | 3.6 km || 
|-id=307 bgcolor=#d6d6d6
| 371307 ||  || — || March 23, 2006 || Kitt Peak || Spacewatch || CHA || align=right | 2.8 km || 
|-id=308 bgcolor=#d6d6d6
| 371308 ||  || — || March 26, 2006 || Mount Lemmon || Mount Lemmon Survey || — || align=right | 2.8 km || 
|-id=309 bgcolor=#E9E9E9
| 371309 ||  || — || April 2, 2006 || Kitt Peak || Spacewatch || — || align=right | 3.6 km || 
|-id=310 bgcolor=#d6d6d6
| 371310 ||  || — || April 2, 2006 || Kitt Peak || Spacewatch || THM || align=right | 2.8 km || 
|-id=311 bgcolor=#d6d6d6
| 371311 ||  || — || April 2, 2006 || Kitt Peak || Spacewatch || — || align=right | 2.5 km || 
|-id=312 bgcolor=#d6d6d6
| 371312 ||  || — || April 2, 2006 || Mount Lemmon || Mount Lemmon Survey || — || align=right | 3.2 km || 
|-id=313 bgcolor=#d6d6d6
| 371313 ||  || — || April 2, 2006 || Anderson Mesa || LONEOS || — || align=right | 4.1 km || 
|-id=314 bgcolor=#d6d6d6
| 371314 ||  || — || April 7, 2006 || Siding Spring || SSS || EUP || align=right | 4.3 km || 
|-id=315 bgcolor=#d6d6d6
| 371315 ||  || — || April 19, 2006 || Kitt Peak || Spacewatch || — || align=right | 2.5 km || 
|-id=316 bgcolor=#d6d6d6
| 371316 ||  || — || April 19, 2006 || Mount Lemmon || Mount Lemmon Survey || THM || align=right | 2.3 km || 
|-id=317 bgcolor=#E9E9E9
| 371317 ||  || — || April 20, 2006 || Kitt Peak || Spacewatch || — || align=right | 1.0 km || 
|-id=318 bgcolor=#d6d6d6
| 371318 ||  || — || April 21, 2006 || Kitt Peak || Spacewatch || — || align=right | 3.5 km || 
|-id=319 bgcolor=#d6d6d6
| 371319 ||  || — || April 24, 2006 || Kitt Peak || Spacewatch || HYG || align=right | 2.7 km || 
|-id=320 bgcolor=#fefefe
| 371320 ||  || — || April 24, 2006 || Kitt Peak || Spacewatch || FLO || align=right data-sort-value="0.49" | 490 m || 
|-id=321 bgcolor=#d6d6d6
| 371321 ||  || — || April 24, 2006 || Kitt Peak || Spacewatch || HYG || align=right | 2.9 km || 
|-id=322 bgcolor=#d6d6d6
| 371322 ||  || — || April 25, 2006 || Kitt Peak || Spacewatch || — || align=right | 3.1 km || 
|-id=323 bgcolor=#d6d6d6
| 371323 ||  || — || April 26, 2006 || Kitt Peak || Spacewatch || CRO || align=right | 3.6 km || 
|-id=324 bgcolor=#d6d6d6
| 371324 ||  || — || April 29, 2006 || Kitt Peak || Spacewatch || — || align=right | 3.1 km || 
|-id=325 bgcolor=#d6d6d6
| 371325 ||  || — || April 30, 2006 || Kitt Peak || Spacewatch || THM || align=right | 2.5 km || 
|-id=326 bgcolor=#d6d6d6
| 371326 ||  || — || May 2, 2006 || Mount Lemmon || Mount Lemmon Survey || — || align=right | 3.6 km || 
|-id=327 bgcolor=#d6d6d6
| 371327 ||  || — || May 2, 2006 || Mount Lemmon || Mount Lemmon Survey || — || align=right | 4.0 km || 
|-id=328 bgcolor=#fefefe
| 371328 ||  || — || May 1, 2006 || Kitt Peak || Spacewatch || critical || align=right data-sort-value="0.49" | 490 m || 
|-id=329 bgcolor=#d6d6d6
| 371329 ||  || — || May 1, 2006 || Kitt Peak || Spacewatch || EOS || align=right | 2.0 km || 
|-id=330 bgcolor=#d6d6d6
| 371330 ||  || — || May 2, 2006 || Kitt Peak || Spacewatch || — || align=right | 2.8 km || 
|-id=331 bgcolor=#fefefe
| 371331 ||  || — || May 2, 2006 || Kitt Peak || Spacewatch || — || align=right data-sort-value="0.68" | 680 m || 
|-id=332 bgcolor=#fefefe
| 371332 ||  || — || May 3, 2006 || Kitt Peak || Spacewatch || — || align=right data-sort-value="0.73" | 730 m || 
|-id=333 bgcolor=#d6d6d6
| 371333 ||  || — || May 3, 2006 || Kitt Peak || Spacewatch || VER || align=right | 3.6 km || 
|-id=334 bgcolor=#d6d6d6
| 371334 ||  || — || May 1, 2006 || Kitt Peak || M. W. Buie || — || align=right | 3.5 km || 
|-id=335 bgcolor=#d6d6d6
| 371335 ||  || — || May 9, 2006 || Mount Lemmon || Mount Lemmon Survey || — || align=right | 3.1 km || 
|-id=336 bgcolor=#FFC2E0
| 371336 ||  || — || May 20, 2006 || Socorro || LINEAR || APO +1km || align=right | 1.1 km || 
|-id=337 bgcolor=#fefefe
| 371337 ||  || — || May 18, 2006 || Palomar || NEAT || — || align=right data-sort-value="0.89" | 890 m || 
|-id=338 bgcolor=#d6d6d6
| 371338 ||  || — || May 19, 2006 || Mount Lemmon || Mount Lemmon Survey || — || align=right | 5.3 km || 
|-id=339 bgcolor=#d6d6d6
| 371339 ||  || — || May 21, 2006 || Kitt Peak || Spacewatch || — || align=right | 3.2 km || 
|-id=340 bgcolor=#fefefe
| 371340 ||  || — || May 21, 2006 || Siding Spring || SSS || — || align=right data-sort-value="0.68" | 680 m || 
|-id=341 bgcolor=#d6d6d6
| 371341 ||  || — || May 20, 2006 || Kitt Peak || Spacewatch || — || align=right | 3.4 km || 
|-id=342 bgcolor=#d6d6d6
| 371342 ||  || — || May 21, 2006 || Anderson Mesa || LONEOS || — || align=right | 5.8 km || 
|-id=343 bgcolor=#d6d6d6
| 371343 ||  || — || May 21, 2006 || Kitt Peak || Spacewatch || THM || align=right | 2.6 km || 
|-id=344 bgcolor=#d6d6d6
| 371344 ||  || — || May 21, 2006 || Kitt Peak || Spacewatch || — || align=right | 3.5 km || 
|-id=345 bgcolor=#d6d6d6
| 371345 ||  || — || May 21, 2006 || Kitt Peak || Spacewatch || — || align=right | 2.9 km || 
|-id=346 bgcolor=#d6d6d6
| 371346 ||  || — || May 21, 2006 || Kitt Peak || Spacewatch || EOS || align=right | 4.6 km || 
|-id=347 bgcolor=#d6d6d6
| 371347 ||  || — || May 24, 2006 || Mount Lemmon || Mount Lemmon Survey || EOS || align=right | 2.3 km || 
|-id=348 bgcolor=#d6d6d6
| 371348 ||  || — || May 20, 2006 || Kitt Peak || Spacewatch || EOS || align=right | 2.2 km || 
|-id=349 bgcolor=#d6d6d6
| 371349 ||  || — || May 25, 2006 || Kitt Peak || Spacewatch || — || align=right | 3.4 km || 
|-id=350 bgcolor=#d6d6d6
| 371350 ||  || — || May 30, 2006 || Kitt Peak || Spacewatch || — || align=right | 3.8 km || 
|-id=351 bgcolor=#d6d6d6
| 371351 ||  || — || May 23, 2006 || Kitt Peak || Spacewatch || — || align=right | 3.2 km || 
|-id=352 bgcolor=#d6d6d6
| 371352 ||  || — || May 25, 2006 || Kitt Peak || Spacewatch || — || align=right | 3.1 km || 
|-id=353 bgcolor=#fefefe
| 371353 ||  || — || June 3, 2006 || Mount Lemmon || Mount Lemmon Survey || — || align=right data-sort-value="0.62" | 620 m || 
|-id=354 bgcolor=#fefefe
| 371354 ||  || — || June 1, 2006 || Kitt Peak || Spacewatch || — || align=right data-sort-value="0.65" | 650 m || 
|-id=355 bgcolor=#d6d6d6
| 371355 ||  || — || June 18, 2006 || Kitt Peak || Spacewatch || — || align=right | 4.5 km || 
|-id=356 bgcolor=#d6d6d6
| 371356 ||  || — || June 16, 2006 || Kitt Peak || Spacewatch || — || align=right | 3.8 km || 
|-id=357 bgcolor=#fefefe
| 371357 ||  || — || June 22, 2006 || Palomar || NEAT || — || align=right | 1.0 km || 
|-id=358 bgcolor=#fefefe
| 371358 ||  || — || May 30, 2006 || Mount Lemmon || Mount Lemmon Survey || V || align=right data-sort-value="0.64" | 640 m || 
|-id=359 bgcolor=#fefefe
| 371359 ||  || — || July 20, 2006 || Palomar || NEAT || FLO || align=right data-sort-value="0.58" | 580 m || 
|-id=360 bgcolor=#fefefe
| 371360 ||  || — || August 15, 2006 || Reedy Creek || J. Broughton || — || align=right data-sort-value="0.82" | 820 m || 
|-id=361 bgcolor=#fefefe
| 371361 ||  || — || July 18, 2006 || Mount Lemmon || Mount Lemmon Survey || FLO || align=right data-sort-value="0.62" | 620 m || 
|-id=362 bgcolor=#fefefe
| 371362 ||  || — || August 15, 2006 || Palomar || NEAT || — || align=right | 1.1 km || 
|-id=363 bgcolor=#fefefe
| 371363 ||  || — || August 15, 2006 || Palomar || NEAT || — || align=right data-sort-value="0.76" | 760 m || 
|-id=364 bgcolor=#fefefe
| 371364 ||  || — || August 15, 2006 || Palomar || NEAT || V || align=right data-sort-value="0.96" | 960 m || 
|-id=365 bgcolor=#fefefe
| 371365 ||  || — || August 15, 2006 || Palomar || NEAT || NYS || align=right data-sort-value="0.65" | 650 m || 
|-id=366 bgcolor=#fefefe
| 371366 ||  || — || July 31, 2006 || Siding Spring || SSS || — || align=right | 1.0 km || 
|-id=367 bgcolor=#fefefe
| 371367 ||  || — || August 15, 2006 || Palomar || NEAT || — || align=right data-sort-value="0.81" | 810 m || 
|-id=368 bgcolor=#fefefe
| 371368 ||  || — || August 18, 2006 || Piszkéstető || K. Sárneczky || — || align=right | 1.1 km || 
|-id=369 bgcolor=#fefefe
| 371369 ||  || — || August 21, 2006 || Kitt Peak || Spacewatch || FLO || align=right data-sort-value="0.60" | 600 m || 
|-id=370 bgcolor=#fefefe
| 371370 ||  || — || August 24, 2006 || Socorro || LINEAR || V || align=right data-sort-value="0.72" | 720 m || 
|-id=371 bgcolor=#fefefe
| 371371 ||  || — || August 20, 2006 || Kitt Peak || Spacewatch || — || align=right data-sort-value="0.81" | 810 m || 
|-id=372 bgcolor=#fefefe
| 371372 ||  || — || August 23, 2006 || Socorro || LINEAR || FLO || align=right data-sort-value="0.79" | 790 m || 
|-id=373 bgcolor=#fefefe
| 371373 ||  || — || August 21, 2006 || Socorro || LINEAR || FLO || align=right data-sort-value="0.63" | 630 m || 
|-id=374 bgcolor=#fefefe
| 371374 ||  || — || August 24, 2006 || Palomar || NEAT || — || align=right data-sort-value="0.78" | 780 m || 
|-id=375 bgcolor=#fefefe
| 371375 ||  || — || July 18, 2006 || Mount Lemmon || Mount Lemmon Survey || FLO || align=right data-sort-value="0.75" | 750 m || 
|-id=376 bgcolor=#fefefe
| 371376 ||  || — || August 23, 2006 || Socorro || LINEAR || — || align=right data-sort-value="0.64" | 640 m || 
|-id=377 bgcolor=#fefefe
| 371377 ||  || — || August 28, 2006 || Catalina || CSS || NYS || align=right data-sort-value="0.54" | 540 m || 
|-id=378 bgcolor=#fefefe
| 371378 ||  || — || August 27, 2006 || Anderson Mesa || LONEOS || V || align=right data-sort-value="0.59" | 590 m || 
|-id=379 bgcolor=#fefefe
| 371379 ||  || — || August 27, 2006 || Anderson Mesa || LONEOS || — || align=right data-sort-value="0.95" | 950 m || 
|-id=380 bgcolor=#fefefe
| 371380 ||  || — || August 29, 2006 || Catalina || CSS || — || align=right data-sort-value="0.99" | 990 m || 
|-id=381 bgcolor=#fefefe
| 371381 ||  || — || August 16, 2006 || Palomar || NEAT || — || align=right data-sort-value="0.78" | 780 m || 
|-id=382 bgcolor=#fefefe
| 371382 ||  || — || August 18, 2006 || Kitt Peak || Spacewatch || — || align=right data-sort-value="0.91" | 910 m || 
|-id=383 bgcolor=#fefefe
| 371383 ||  || — || August 21, 2006 || Kitt Peak || Spacewatch || — || align=right data-sort-value="0.86" | 860 m || 
|-id=384 bgcolor=#fefefe
| 371384 ||  || — || August 27, 2006 || Apache Point || A. C. Becker || — || align=right data-sort-value="0.87" | 870 m || 
|-id=385 bgcolor=#fefefe
| 371385 ||  || — || August 18, 2006 || Palomar || NEAT || — || align=right data-sort-value="0.80" | 800 m || 
|-id=386 bgcolor=#fefefe
| 371386 || 2006 RE || — || September 1, 2006 || Ottmarsheim || C. Rinner || — || align=right | 1.1 km || 
|-id=387 bgcolor=#fefefe
| 371387 ||  || — || September 12, 2006 || Catalina || CSS || V || align=right data-sort-value="0.67" | 670 m || 
|-id=388 bgcolor=#fefefe
| 371388 ||  || — || August 27, 2006 || Kitt Peak || Spacewatch || — || align=right data-sort-value="0.73" | 730 m || 
|-id=389 bgcolor=#fefefe
| 371389 ||  || — || September 14, 2006 || Palomar || NEAT || NYS || align=right data-sort-value="0.54" | 540 m || 
|-id=390 bgcolor=#fefefe
| 371390 ||  || — || July 21, 2006 || Mount Lemmon || Mount Lemmon Survey || — || align=right data-sort-value="0.88" | 880 m || 
|-id=391 bgcolor=#fefefe
| 371391 ||  || — || September 14, 2006 || Kitt Peak || Spacewatch || PHO || align=right data-sort-value="0.98" | 980 m || 
|-id=392 bgcolor=#fefefe
| 371392 ||  || — || September 14, 2006 || Catalina || CSS || V || align=right data-sort-value="0.73" | 730 m || 
|-id=393 bgcolor=#fefefe
| 371393 ||  || — || September 15, 2006 || Kitt Peak || Spacewatch || FLO || align=right data-sort-value="0.67" | 670 m || 
|-id=394 bgcolor=#fefefe
| 371394 ||  || — || September 15, 2006 || Kitt Peak || Spacewatch || FLO || align=right data-sort-value="0.56" | 560 m || 
|-id=395 bgcolor=#fefefe
| 371395 ||  || — || September 15, 2006 || Kitt Peak || Spacewatch || ERI || align=right | 1.6 km || 
|-id=396 bgcolor=#fefefe
| 371396 ||  || — || September 12, 2006 || Catalina || CSS || FLO || align=right data-sort-value="0.60" | 600 m || 
|-id=397 bgcolor=#fefefe
| 371397 ||  || — || September 15, 2006 || Catalina || CSS || PHO || align=right | 1.3 km || 
|-id=398 bgcolor=#fefefe
| 371398 ||  || — || September 14, 2006 || Catalina || CSS || FLO || align=right data-sort-value="0.75" | 750 m || 
|-id=399 bgcolor=#fefefe
| 371399 ||  || — || September 15, 2006 || Kitt Peak || Spacewatch || — || align=right data-sort-value="0.54" | 540 m || 
|-id=400 bgcolor=#fefefe
| 371400 ||  || — || September 15, 2006 || Kitt Peak || Spacewatch || — || align=right data-sort-value="0.71" | 710 m || 
|}

371401–371500 

|-bgcolor=#fefefe
| 371401 ||  || — || September 15, 2006 || Kitt Peak || Spacewatch || NYS || align=right data-sort-value="0.63" | 630 m || 
|-id=402 bgcolor=#fefefe
| 371402 ||  || — || September 15, 2006 || Kitt Peak || Spacewatch || V || align=right data-sort-value="0.71" | 710 m || 
|-id=403 bgcolor=#fefefe
| 371403 ||  || — || September 15, 2006 || Kitt Peak || Spacewatch || — || align=right data-sort-value="0.66" | 660 m || 
|-id=404 bgcolor=#fefefe
| 371404 ||  || — || September 15, 2006 || Kitt Peak || Spacewatch || — || align=right data-sort-value="0.73" | 730 m || 
|-id=405 bgcolor=#fefefe
| 371405 ||  || — || September 15, 2006 || Kitt Peak || Spacewatch || MAS || align=right data-sort-value="0.69" | 690 m || 
|-id=406 bgcolor=#fefefe
| 371406 ||  || — || September 15, 2006 || Kitt Peak || Spacewatch || V || align=right data-sort-value="0.59" | 590 m || 
|-id=407 bgcolor=#fefefe
| 371407 ||  || — || September 15, 2006 || Kitt Peak || Spacewatch || NYS || align=right data-sort-value="0.65" | 650 m || 
|-id=408 bgcolor=#fefefe
| 371408 ||  || — || September 14, 2006 || Catalina || CSS || FLO || align=right data-sort-value="0.61" | 610 m || 
|-id=409 bgcolor=#fefefe
| 371409 ||  || — || September 15, 2006 || Kitt Peak || Spacewatch || NYS || align=right data-sort-value="0.63" | 630 m || 
|-id=410 bgcolor=#fefefe
| 371410 ||  || — || September 17, 2006 || Catalina || CSS || V || align=right data-sort-value="0.61" | 610 m || 
|-id=411 bgcolor=#fefefe
| 371411 ||  || — || September 17, 2006 || Catalina || CSS || — || align=right data-sort-value="0.88" | 880 m || 
|-id=412 bgcolor=#fefefe
| 371412 ||  || — || September 18, 2006 || Catalina || CSS || NYS || align=right data-sort-value="0.62" | 620 m || 
|-id=413 bgcolor=#fefefe
| 371413 ||  || — || September 18, 2006 || Kitt Peak || Spacewatch || NYS || align=right data-sort-value="0.60" | 600 m || 
|-id=414 bgcolor=#fefefe
| 371414 ||  || — || September 18, 2006 || Kitt Peak || Spacewatch || — || align=right data-sort-value="0.92" | 920 m || 
|-id=415 bgcolor=#fefefe
| 371415 ||  || — || September 18, 2006 || Catalina || CSS || V || align=right data-sort-value="0.90" | 900 m || 
|-id=416 bgcolor=#fefefe
| 371416 ||  || — || September 19, 2006 || Kitt Peak || Spacewatch || MAS || align=right data-sort-value="0.63" | 630 m || 
|-id=417 bgcolor=#fefefe
| 371417 ||  || — || September 19, 2006 || Kitt Peak || Spacewatch || EUT || align=right data-sort-value="0.63" | 630 m || 
|-id=418 bgcolor=#fefefe
| 371418 ||  || — || September 18, 2006 || Kitt Peak || Spacewatch || — || align=right data-sort-value="0.81" | 810 m || 
|-id=419 bgcolor=#fefefe
| 371419 ||  || — || September 18, 2006 || Kitt Peak || Spacewatch || V || align=right data-sort-value="0.60" | 600 m || 
|-id=420 bgcolor=#fefefe
| 371420 ||  || — || September 18, 2006 || Kitt Peak || Spacewatch || NYS || align=right data-sort-value="0.63" | 630 m || 
|-id=421 bgcolor=#fefefe
| 371421 ||  || — || September 19, 2006 || Kitt Peak || Spacewatch || FLO || align=right data-sort-value="0.61" | 610 m || 
|-id=422 bgcolor=#fefefe
| 371422 ||  || — || September 19, 2006 || Kitt Peak || Spacewatch || — || align=right data-sort-value="0.82" | 820 m || 
|-id=423 bgcolor=#fefefe
| 371423 ||  || — || September 19, 2006 || Kitt Peak || Spacewatch || — || align=right data-sort-value="0.80" | 800 m || 
|-id=424 bgcolor=#fefefe
| 371424 ||  || — || September 20, 2006 || Socorro || LINEAR || FLO || align=right data-sort-value="0.72" | 720 m || 
|-id=425 bgcolor=#fefefe
| 371425 ||  || — || September 24, 2006 || Kitt Peak || Spacewatch || — || align=right data-sort-value="0.75" | 750 m || 
|-id=426 bgcolor=#fefefe
| 371426 ||  || — || September 24, 2006 || Kitt Peak || Spacewatch || — || align=right data-sort-value="0.64" | 640 m || 
|-id=427 bgcolor=#fefefe
| 371427 ||  || — || September 19, 2006 || Catalina || CSS || — || align=right data-sort-value="0.73" | 730 m || 
|-id=428 bgcolor=#fefefe
| 371428 ||  || — || September 19, 2006 || Kitt Peak || Spacewatch || NYS || align=right data-sort-value="0.59" | 590 m || 
|-id=429 bgcolor=#fefefe
| 371429 ||  || — || September 23, 2006 || Kitt Peak || Spacewatch || V || align=right data-sort-value="0.66" | 660 m || 
|-id=430 bgcolor=#fefefe
| 371430 ||  || — || September 24, 2006 || Kitt Peak || Spacewatch || NYS || align=right data-sort-value="0.55" | 550 m || 
|-id=431 bgcolor=#fefefe
| 371431 ||  || — || September 25, 2006 || Mount Lemmon || Mount Lemmon Survey || — || align=right data-sort-value="0.89" | 890 m || 
|-id=432 bgcolor=#fefefe
| 371432 ||  || — || September 25, 2006 || Mount Lemmon || Mount Lemmon Survey || — || align=right data-sort-value="0.83" | 830 m || 
|-id=433 bgcolor=#fefefe
| 371433 ||  || — || September 26, 2006 || Mount Lemmon || Mount Lemmon Survey || NYS || align=right data-sort-value="0.68" | 680 m || 
|-id=434 bgcolor=#fefefe
| 371434 ||  || — || September 24, 2006 || Kitt Peak || Spacewatch || — || align=right data-sort-value="0.71" | 710 m || 
|-id=435 bgcolor=#fefefe
| 371435 ||  || — || September 25, 2006 || Mount Lemmon || Mount Lemmon Survey || — || align=right data-sort-value="0.81" | 810 m || 
|-id=436 bgcolor=#fefefe
| 371436 ||  || — || September 26, 2006 || Catalina || CSS || — || align=right | 1.1 km || 
|-id=437 bgcolor=#fefefe
| 371437 ||  || — || September 27, 2006 || Kitt Peak || Spacewatch || FLO || align=right data-sort-value="0.67" | 670 m || 
|-id=438 bgcolor=#fefefe
| 371438 ||  || — || September 25, 2006 || Mount Lemmon || Mount Lemmon Survey || FLO || align=right data-sort-value="0.60" | 600 m || 
|-id=439 bgcolor=#fefefe
| 371439 ||  || — || September 18, 2006 || Kitt Peak || Spacewatch || — || align=right data-sort-value="0.67" | 670 m || 
|-id=440 bgcolor=#fefefe
| 371440 ||  || — || September 26, 2006 || Kitt Peak || Spacewatch || MAS || align=right data-sort-value="0.78" | 780 m || 
|-id=441 bgcolor=#fefefe
| 371441 ||  || — || September 19, 2006 || Kitt Peak || Spacewatch || — || align=right data-sort-value="0.76" | 760 m || 
|-id=442 bgcolor=#fefefe
| 371442 ||  || — || September 27, 2006 || Mount Lemmon || Mount Lemmon Survey || — || align=right | 2.2 km || 
|-id=443 bgcolor=#fefefe
| 371443 ||  || — || September 27, 2006 || Mount Lemmon || Mount Lemmon Survey || NYS || align=right data-sort-value="0.55" | 550 m || 
|-id=444 bgcolor=#fefefe
| 371444 ||  || — || September 28, 2006 || Mount Lemmon || Mount Lemmon Survey || V || align=right data-sort-value="0.65" | 650 m || 
|-id=445 bgcolor=#E9E9E9
| 371445 ||  || — || September 24, 2006 || Kitt Peak || Spacewatch || — || align=right | 2.1 km || 
|-id=446 bgcolor=#fefefe
| 371446 ||  || — || September 25, 2006 || Socorro || LINEAR || — || align=right data-sort-value="0.83" | 830 m || 
|-id=447 bgcolor=#fefefe
| 371447 ||  || — || September 30, 2006 || Catalina || CSS || — || align=right data-sort-value="0.80" | 800 m || 
|-id=448 bgcolor=#fefefe
| 371448 ||  || — || September 25, 2006 || Kitt Peak || Spacewatch || V || align=right data-sort-value="0.68" | 680 m || 
|-id=449 bgcolor=#fefefe
| 371449 ||  || — || September 26, 2006 || Catalina || CSS || — || align=right data-sort-value="0.83" | 830 m || 
|-id=450 bgcolor=#fefefe
| 371450 ||  || — || September 27, 2006 || Kitt Peak || Spacewatch || MAS || align=right data-sort-value="0.53" | 530 m || 
|-id=451 bgcolor=#fefefe
| 371451 ||  || — || September 27, 2006 || Kitt Peak || Spacewatch || NYS || align=right data-sort-value="0.55" | 550 m || 
|-id=452 bgcolor=#fefefe
| 371452 ||  || — || September 27, 2006 || Kitt Peak || Spacewatch || NYS || align=right data-sort-value="0.60" | 600 m || 
|-id=453 bgcolor=#fefefe
| 371453 ||  || — || September 27, 2006 || Kitt Peak || Spacewatch || MAS || align=right data-sort-value="0.67" | 670 m || 
|-id=454 bgcolor=#fefefe
| 371454 ||  || — || September 27, 2006 || Kitt Peak || Spacewatch || — || align=right | 1.1 km || 
|-id=455 bgcolor=#fefefe
| 371455 ||  || — || September 28, 2006 || Mount Lemmon || Mount Lemmon Survey || NYS || align=right data-sort-value="0.70" | 700 m || 
|-id=456 bgcolor=#fefefe
| 371456 ||  || — || September 15, 2006 || Kitt Peak || Spacewatch || NYS || align=right data-sort-value="0.64" | 640 m || 
|-id=457 bgcolor=#fefefe
| 371457 ||  || — || September 28, 2006 || Kitt Peak || Spacewatch || NYS || align=right data-sort-value="0.64" | 640 m || 
|-id=458 bgcolor=#fefefe
| 371458 ||  || — || September 30, 2006 || Catalina || CSS || NYS || align=right data-sort-value="0.75" | 750 m || 
|-id=459 bgcolor=#fefefe
| 371459 ||  || — || September 30, 2006 || Mount Lemmon || Mount Lemmon Survey || NYS || align=right data-sort-value="0.70" | 700 m || 
|-id=460 bgcolor=#fefefe
| 371460 ||  || — || September 30, 2006 || Mount Lemmon || Mount Lemmon Survey || NYS || align=right data-sort-value="0.70" | 700 m || 
|-id=461 bgcolor=#fefefe
| 371461 ||  || — || September 28, 2006 || Mount Lemmon || Mount Lemmon Survey || — || align=right data-sort-value="0.88" | 880 m || 
|-id=462 bgcolor=#fefefe
| 371462 ||  || — || September 28, 2006 || Catalina || CSS || PHO || align=right | 1.2 km || 
|-id=463 bgcolor=#fefefe
| 371463 ||  || — || September 17, 2006 || Kitt Peak || Spacewatch || — || align=right data-sort-value="0.85" | 850 m || 
|-id=464 bgcolor=#fefefe
| 371464 ||  || — || September 28, 2006 || Catalina || CSS || — || align=right data-sort-value="0.78" | 780 m || 
|-id=465 bgcolor=#fefefe
| 371465 ||  || — || September 19, 2006 || Kitt Peak || Spacewatch || — || align=right data-sort-value="0.62" | 620 m || 
|-id=466 bgcolor=#fefefe
| 371466 ||  || — || September 17, 2006 || Kitt Peak || Spacewatch || — || align=right data-sort-value="0.86" | 860 m || 
|-id=467 bgcolor=#FA8072
| 371467 ||  || — || September 30, 2006 || Catalina || CSS || — || align=right data-sort-value="0.70" | 700 m || 
|-id=468 bgcolor=#fefefe
| 371468 ||  || — || October 2, 2006 || Mount Lemmon || Mount Lemmon Survey || NYS || align=right data-sort-value="0.67" | 670 m || 
|-id=469 bgcolor=#fefefe
| 371469 ||  || — || October 3, 2006 || Mount Lemmon || Mount Lemmon Survey || NYS || align=right data-sort-value="0.61" | 610 m || 
|-id=470 bgcolor=#fefefe
| 371470 ||  || — || October 11, 2006 || Kitt Peak || Spacewatch || MAS || align=right data-sort-value="0.74" | 740 m || 
|-id=471 bgcolor=#fefefe
| 371471 ||  || — || October 10, 2006 || Palomar || NEAT || — || align=right data-sort-value="0.84" | 840 m || 
|-id=472 bgcolor=#fefefe
| 371472 ||  || — || October 11, 2006 || Kitt Peak || Spacewatch || — || align=right data-sort-value="0.75" | 750 m || 
|-id=473 bgcolor=#fefefe
| 371473 ||  || — || October 11, 2006 || Kitt Peak || Spacewatch || NYS || align=right data-sort-value="0.68" | 680 m || 
|-id=474 bgcolor=#fefefe
| 371474 ||  || — || October 11, 2006 || Kitt Peak || Spacewatch || — || align=right | 1.1 km || 
|-id=475 bgcolor=#fefefe
| 371475 ||  || — || October 12, 2006 || Kitt Peak || Spacewatch || — || align=right data-sort-value="0.79" | 790 m || 
|-id=476 bgcolor=#fefefe
| 371476 ||  || — || October 12, 2006 || Kitt Peak || Spacewatch || V || align=right data-sort-value="0.70" | 700 m || 
|-id=477 bgcolor=#fefefe
| 371477 ||  || — || October 12, 2006 || Kitt Peak || Spacewatch || — || align=right data-sort-value="0.77" | 770 m || 
|-id=478 bgcolor=#fefefe
| 371478 ||  || — || October 12, 2006 || Kitt Peak || Spacewatch || V || align=right data-sort-value="0.79" | 790 m || 
|-id=479 bgcolor=#fefefe
| 371479 ||  || — || October 12, 2006 || Kitt Peak || Spacewatch || NYS || align=right data-sort-value="0.67" | 670 m || 
|-id=480 bgcolor=#fefefe
| 371480 ||  || — || October 12, 2006 || Kitt Peak || Spacewatch || NYS || align=right data-sort-value="0.63" | 630 m || 
|-id=481 bgcolor=#fefefe
| 371481 ||  || — || October 12, 2006 || Kitt Peak || Spacewatch || NYS || align=right data-sort-value="0.61" | 610 m || 
|-id=482 bgcolor=#fefefe
| 371482 ||  || — || October 12, 2006 || Kitt Peak || Spacewatch || MAS || align=right data-sort-value="0.65" | 650 m || 
|-id=483 bgcolor=#fefefe
| 371483 ||  || — || October 12, 2006 || Kitt Peak || Spacewatch || ERI || align=right | 1.4 km || 
|-id=484 bgcolor=#fefefe
| 371484 ||  || — || September 30, 2006 || Mount Lemmon || Mount Lemmon Survey || — || align=right data-sort-value="0.53" | 530 m || 
|-id=485 bgcolor=#fefefe
| 371485 ||  || — || September 18, 2006 || Kitt Peak || Spacewatch || — || align=right data-sort-value="0.59" | 590 m || 
|-id=486 bgcolor=#fefefe
| 371486 ||  || — || October 11, 2006 || Palomar || NEAT || FLO || align=right data-sort-value="0.85" | 850 m || 
|-id=487 bgcolor=#fefefe
| 371487 ||  || — || October 11, 2006 || Palomar || NEAT || — || align=right data-sort-value="0.92" | 920 m || 
|-id=488 bgcolor=#fefefe
| 371488 ||  || — || October 11, 2006 || Palomar || NEAT || — || align=right | 1.0 km || 
|-id=489 bgcolor=#fefefe
| 371489 ||  || — || September 30, 2006 || Catalina || CSS || — || align=right data-sort-value="0.92" | 920 m || 
|-id=490 bgcolor=#fefefe
| 371490 ||  || — || October 13, 2006 || Kitt Peak || Spacewatch || — || align=right | 1.2 km || 
|-id=491 bgcolor=#fefefe
| 371491 ||  || — || October 15, 2006 || Kitt Peak || Spacewatch || NYS || align=right data-sort-value="0.55" | 550 m || 
|-id=492 bgcolor=#fefefe
| 371492 ||  || — || October 15, 2006 || Kitt Peak || Spacewatch || NYS || align=right data-sort-value="0.67" | 670 m || 
|-id=493 bgcolor=#fefefe
| 371493 ||  || — || October 15, 2006 || Lulin Observatory || C.-S. Lin, Q.-z. Ye || — || align=right data-sort-value="0.94" | 940 m || 
|-id=494 bgcolor=#fefefe
| 371494 ||  || — || October 15, 2006 || Kitt Peak || Spacewatch || NYS || align=right data-sort-value="0.48" | 480 m || 
|-id=495 bgcolor=#fefefe
| 371495 ||  || — || October 13, 2006 || Kitt Peak || Spacewatch || SUL || align=right | 1.7 km || 
|-id=496 bgcolor=#fefefe
| 371496 ||  || — || October 17, 2006 || Mount Lemmon || Mount Lemmon Survey || — || align=right data-sort-value="0.74" | 740 m || 
|-id=497 bgcolor=#fefefe
| 371497 ||  || — || September 26, 2006 || Mount Lemmon || Mount Lemmon Survey || — || align=right data-sort-value="0.89" | 890 m || 
|-id=498 bgcolor=#fefefe
| 371498 ||  || — || October 16, 2006 || Kitt Peak || Spacewatch || — || align=right data-sort-value="0.69" | 690 m || 
|-id=499 bgcolor=#fefefe
| 371499 ||  || — || October 16, 2006 || Kitt Peak || Spacewatch || NYS || align=right data-sort-value="0.53" | 530 m || 
|-id=500 bgcolor=#fefefe
| 371500 ||  || — || October 16, 2006 || Kitt Peak || Spacewatch || NYS || align=right data-sort-value="0.90" | 900 m || 
|}

371501–371600 

|-bgcolor=#fefefe
| 371501 ||  || — || October 16, 2006 || Kitt Peak || Spacewatch || NYS || align=right data-sort-value="0.58" | 580 m || 
|-id=502 bgcolor=#fefefe
| 371502 ||  || — || October 16, 2006 || Kitt Peak || Spacewatch || — || align=right | 1.0 km || 
|-id=503 bgcolor=#fefefe
| 371503 ||  || — || October 16, 2006 || Kitt Peak || Spacewatch || MAS || align=right data-sort-value="0.71" | 710 m || 
|-id=504 bgcolor=#fefefe
| 371504 ||  || — || October 16, 2006 || Kitt Peak || Spacewatch || V || align=right data-sort-value="0.65" | 650 m || 
|-id=505 bgcolor=#fefefe
| 371505 ||  || — || October 21, 2006 || 7300 || W. K. Y. Yeung || — || align=right data-sort-value="0.90" | 900 m || 
|-id=506 bgcolor=#fefefe
| 371506 ||  || — || October 16, 2006 || Catalina || CSS || — || align=right data-sort-value="0.92" | 920 m || 
|-id=507 bgcolor=#fefefe
| 371507 ||  || — || October 16, 2006 || Kitt Peak || Spacewatch || — || align=right | 1.0 km || 
|-id=508 bgcolor=#fefefe
| 371508 ||  || — || October 17, 2006 || Kitt Peak || Spacewatch || NYS || align=right data-sort-value="0.51" | 510 m || 
|-id=509 bgcolor=#fefefe
| 371509 ||  || — || October 17, 2006 || Kitt Peak || Spacewatch || — || align=right data-sort-value="0.85" | 850 m || 
|-id=510 bgcolor=#fefefe
| 371510 ||  || — || September 25, 2006 || Kitt Peak || Spacewatch || — || align=right data-sort-value="0.90" | 900 m || 
|-id=511 bgcolor=#fefefe
| 371511 ||  || — || October 17, 2006 || Mount Lemmon || Mount Lemmon Survey || V || align=right data-sort-value="0.68" | 680 m || 
|-id=512 bgcolor=#fefefe
| 371512 ||  || — || October 17, 2006 || Kitt Peak || Spacewatch || NYS || align=right data-sort-value="0.74" | 740 m || 
|-id=513 bgcolor=#FA8072
| 371513 ||  || — || October 17, 2006 || Kitt Peak || Spacewatch || — || align=right data-sort-value="0.99" | 990 m || 
|-id=514 bgcolor=#fefefe
| 371514 ||  || — || October 17, 2006 || Kitt Peak || Spacewatch || — || align=right data-sort-value="0.72" | 720 m || 
|-id=515 bgcolor=#fefefe
| 371515 ||  || — || October 2, 2006 || Mount Lemmon || Mount Lemmon Survey || MAS || align=right data-sort-value="0.84" | 840 m || 
|-id=516 bgcolor=#fefefe
| 371516 ||  || — || October 19, 2006 || Palomar || NEAT || FLO || align=right data-sort-value="0.75" | 750 m || 
|-id=517 bgcolor=#fefefe
| 371517 ||  || — || October 19, 2006 || Kitt Peak || Spacewatch || NYS || align=right data-sort-value="0.60" | 600 m || 
|-id=518 bgcolor=#fefefe
| 371518 ||  || — || September 17, 2006 || Kitt Peak || Spacewatch || NYS || align=right data-sort-value="0.62" | 620 m || 
|-id=519 bgcolor=#fefefe
| 371519 ||  || — || October 21, 2006 || Mount Lemmon || Mount Lemmon Survey || — || align=right data-sort-value="0.82" | 820 m || 
|-id=520 bgcolor=#fefefe
| 371520 ||  || — || October 21, 2006 || Mount Lemmon || Mount Lemmon Survey || — || align=right data-sort-value="0.94" | 940 m || 
|-id=521 bgcolor=#fefefe
| 371521 ||  || — || October 16, 2006 || Catalina || CSS || V || align=right data-sort-value="0.76" | 760 m || 
|-id=522 bgcolor=#C2FFFF
| 371522 ||  || — || October 27, 2006 || Mount Lemmon || Mount Lemmon Survey || n.a. || align=right | 8.7 km || 
|-id=523 bgcolor=#fefefe
| 371523 ||  || — || October 19, 2006 || Catalina || CSS || — || align=right data-sort-value="0.72" | 720 m || 
|-id=524 bgcolor=#fefefe
| 371524 ||  || — || October 20, 2006 || Kitt Peak || Spacewatch || — || align=right data-sort-value="0.89" | 890 m || 
|-id=525 bgcolor=#fefefe
| 371525 ||  || — || October 20, 2006 || Kitt Peak || Spacewatch || MAS || align=right data-sort-value="0.50" | 500 m || 
|-id=526 bgcolor=#fefefe
| 371526 ||  || — || October 23, 2006 || Kitt Peak || Spacewatch || — || align=right data-sort-value="0.91" | 910 m || 
|-id=527 bgcolor=#FA8072
| 371527 ||  || — || October 28, 2006 || Calvin-Rehoboth || L. A. Molnar || — || align=right data-sort-value="0.90" | 900 m || 
|-id=528 bgcolor=#fefefe
| 371528 ||  || — || October 16, 2006 || Catalina || CSS || FLO || align=right data-sort-value="0.73" | 730 m || 
|-id=529 bgcolor=#fefefe
| 371529 ||  || — || October 17, 2006 || Kitt Peak || Spacewatch || — || align=right data-sort-value="0.80" | 800 m || 
|-id=530 bgcolor=#fefefe
| 371530 ||  || — || February 29, 2004 || Kitt Peak || Spacewatch || — || align=right data-sort-value="0.82" | 820 m || 
|-id=531 bgcolor=#fefefe
| 371531 ||  || — || October 19, 2006 || Catalina || CSS || FLO || align=right data-sort-value="0.75" | 750 m || 
|-id=532 bgcolor=#fefefe
| 371532 ||  || — || October 22, 2006 || Mount Lemmon || Mount Lemmon Survey || V || align=right data-sort-value="0.87" | 870 m || 
|-id=533 bgcolor=#d6d6d6
| 371533 ||  || — || October 23, 2006 || Kitt Peak || Spacewatch || SHU3:2 || align=right | 5.0 km || 
|-id=534 bgcolor=#fefefe
| 371534 ||  || — || September 26, 2006 || Mount Lemmon || Mount Lemmon Survey || NYS || align=right data-sort-value="0.70" | 700 m || 
|-id=535 bgcolor=#fefefe
| 371535 ||  || — || October 27, 2006 || Mount Lemmon || Mount Lemmon Survey || NYS || align=right data-sort-value="0.60" | 600 m || 
|-id=536 bgcolor=#fefefe
| 371536 ||  || — || October 27, 2006 || Catalina || CSS || FLO || align=right data-sort-value="0.70" | 700 m || 
|-id=537 bgcolor=#fefefe
| 371537 ||  || — || October 4, 2006 || Mount Lemmon || Mount Lemmon Survey || MAS || align=right data-sort-value="0.71" | 710 m || 
|-id=538 bgcolor=#fefefe
| 371538 ||  || — || October 27, 2006 || Kitt Peak || Spacewatch || NYS || align=right data-sort-value="0.69" | 690 m || 
|-id=539 bgcolor=#fefefe
| 371539 ||  || — || October 28, 2006 || Kitt Peak || Spacewatch || NYS || align=right data-sort-value="0.86" | 860 m || 
|-id=540 bgcolor=#fefefe
| 371540 ||  || — || October 28, 2006 || Kitt Peak || Spacewatch || MAS || align=right data-sort-value="0.70" | 700 m || 
|-id=541 bgcolor=#fefefe
| 371541 ||  || — || October 31, 2006 || Kitt Peak || Spacewatch || — || align=right data-sort-value="0.78" | 780 m || 
|-id=542 bgcolor=#fefefe
| 371542 ||  || — || October 30, 2006 || Catalina || CSS || — || align=right | 1.1 km || 
|-id=543 bgcolor=#fefefe
| 371543 ||  || — || October 24, 2006 || Cordell-Lorenz || Cordell–Lorenz Obs. || MAS || align=right data-sort-value="0.74" | 740 m || 
|-id=544 bgcolor=#fefefe
| 371544 ||  || — || September 14, 2006 || Catalina || CSS || — || align=right data-sort-value="0.82" | 820 m || 
|-id=545 bgcolor=#fefefe
| 371545 ||  || — || October 19, 2006 || Kitt Peak || M. W. Buie || NYS || align=right data-sort-value="0.55" | 550 m || 
|-id=546 bgcolor=#fefefe
| 371546 ||  || — || October 19, 2006 || Catalina || CSS || V || align=right data-sort-value="0.83" | 830 m || 
|-id=547 bgcolor=#fefefe
| 371547 ||  || — || October 16, 2006 || Kitt Peak || Spacewatch || NYS || align=right data-sort-value="0.54" | 540 m || 
|-id=548 bgcolor=#d6d6d6
| 371548 ||  || — || October 26, 2006 || Mauna Kea || P. A. Wiegert || 3:2 || align=right | 4.2 km || 
|-id=549 bgcolor=#fefefe
| 371549 ||  || — || November 2, 2006 || Mount Lemmon || Mount Lemmon Survey || — || align=right | 1.1 km || 
|-id=550 bgcolor=#fefefe
| 371550 ||  || — || November 11, 2006 || Mount Lemmon || Mount Lemmon Survey || MAS || align=right data-sort-value="0.78" | 780 m || 
|-id=551 bgcolor=#fefefe
| 371551 ||  || — || November 9, 2006 || Kitt Peak || Spacewatch || — || align=right data-sort-value="0.88" | 880 m || 
|-id=552 bgcolor=#fefefe
| 371552 ||  || — || November 9, 2006 || Kitt Peak || Spacewatch || NYS || align=right data-sort-value="0.73" | 730 m || 
|-id=553 bgcolor=#fefefe
| 371553 ||  || — || November 10, 2006 || Kitt Peak || Spacewatch || NYS || align=right data-sort-value="0.65" | 650 m || 
|-id=554 bgcolor=#fefefe
| 371554 ||  || — || November 10, 2006 || Kitt Peak || Spacewatch || NYS || align=right data-sort-value="0.67" | 670 m || 
|-id=555 bgcolor=#fefefe
| 371555 ||  || — || November 10, 2006 || Kitt Peak || Spacewatch || NYS || align=right data-sort-value="0.93" | 930 m || 
|-id=556 bgcolor=#fefefe
| 371556 ||  || — || November 10, 2006 || Kitt Peak || Spacewatch || NYS || align=right data-sort-value="0.59" | 590 m || 
|-id=557 bgcolor=#fefefe
| 371557 ||  || — || November 10, 2006 || Kitt Peak || Spacewatch || — || align=right data-sort-value="0.91" | 910 m || 
|-id=558 bgcolor=#fefefe
| 371558 ||  || — || November 10, 2006 || Kitt Peak || Spacewatch || NYS || align=right data-sort-value="0.58" | 580 m || 
|-id=559 bgcolor=#fefefe
| 371559 ||  || — || November 12, 2006 || Mount Lemmon || Mount Lemmon Survey || CLA || align=right | 1.5 km || 
|-id=560 bgcolor=#fefefe
| 371560 ||  || — || November 11, 2006 || Kitt Peak || Spacewatch || V || align=right data-sort-value="0.69" | 690 m || 
|-id=561 bgcolor=#fefefe
| 371561 ||  || — || November 11, 2006 || Kitt Peak || Spacewatch || NYS || align=right data-sort-value="0.62" | 620 m || 
|-id=562 bgcolor=#fefefe
| 371562 ||  || — || November 11, 2006 || Kitt Peak || Spacewatch || NYS || align=right data-sort-value="0.69" | 690 m || 
|-id=563 bgcolor=#fefefe
| 371563 ||  || — || November 11, 2006 || Kitt Peak || Spacewatch || — || align=right data-sort-value="0.96" | 960 m || 
|-id=564 bgcolor=#fefefe
| 371564 ||  || — || November 11, 2006 || Catalina || CSS || — || align=right data-sort-value="0.95" | 950 m || 
|-id=565 bgcolor=#fefefe
| 371565 ||  || — || November 11, 2006 || Catalina || CSS || MAS || align=right data-sort-value="0.80" | 800 m || 
|-id=566 bgcolor=#fefefe
| 371566 ||  || — || November 11, 2006 || Kitt Peak || Spacewatch || MAS || align=right | 1.1 km || 
|-id=567 bgcolor=#fefefe
| 371567 ||  || — || November 11, 2006 || Mount Lemmon || Mount Lemmon Survey || MAS || align=right data-sort-value="0.71" | 710 m || 
|-id=568 bgcolor=#fefefe
| 371568 ||  || — || November 15, 2006 || Ottmarsheim || C. Rinner || NYS || align=right data-sort-value="0.65" | 650 m || 
|-id=569 bgcolor=#fefefe
| 371569 ||  || — || October 22, 2006 || Mount Lemmon || Mount Lemmon Survey || ERI || align=right | 1.7 km || 
|-id=570 bgcolor=#fefefe
| 371570 ||  || — || November 13, 2006 || Palomar || NEAT || NYS || align=right data-sort-value="0.84" | 840 m || 
|-id=571 bgcolor=#fefefe
| 371571 ||  || — || November 13, 2006 || Catalina || CSS || — || align=right data-sort-value="0.98" | 980 m || 
|-id=572 bgcolor=#fefefe
| 371572 ||  || — || November 13, 2006 || Kitt Peak || Spacewatch || — || align=right data-sort-value="0.99" | 990 m || 
|-id=573 bgcolor=#fefefe
| 371573 ||  || — || November 14, 2006 || Kitt Peak || Spacewatch || MAS || align=right data-sort-value="0.84" | 840 m || 
|-id=574 bgcolor=#fefefe
| 371574 ||  || — || November 15, 2006 || Kitt Peak || Spacewatch || MAS || align=right data-sort-value="0.64" | 640 m || 
|-id=575 bgcolor=#fefefe
| 371575 ||  || — || November 15, 2006 || Kitt Peak || Spacewatch || V || align=right data-sort-value="0.59" | 590 m || 
|-id=576 bgcolor=#fefefe
| 371576 ||  || — || November 15, 2006 || Kitt Peak || Spacewatch || NYS || align=right data-sort-value="0.74" | 740 m || 
|-id=577 bgcolor=#fefefe
| 371577 ||  || — || November 15, 2006 || Kitt Peak || Spacewatch || MAS || align=right data-sort-value="0.83" | 830 m || 
|-id=578 bgcolor=#fefefe
| 371578 ||  || — || November 14, 2006 || Kitt Peak || Spacewatch || — || align=right data-sort-value="0.78" | 780 m || 
|-id=579 bgcolor=#fefefe
| 371579 ||  || — || November 14, 2006 || Kitt Peak || Spacewatch || NYS || align=right data-sort-value="0.68" | 680 m || 
|-id=580 bgcolor=#fefefe
| 371580 ||  || — || September 25, 2006 || Mount Lemmon || Mount Lemmon Survey || NYS || align=right data-sort-value="0.52" | 520 m || 
|-id=581 bgcolor=#fefefe
| 371581 ||  || — || October 3, 2006 || Mount Lemmon || Mount Lemmon Survey || ERI || align=right | 1.4 km || 
|-id=582 bgcolor=#fefefe
| 371582 ||  || — || November 15, 2006 || Kitt Peak || Spacewatch || MAS || align=right data-sort-value="0.57" | 570 m || 
|-id=583 bgcolor=#fefefe
| 371583 ||  || — || November 1, 2006 || Mount Lemmon || Mount Lemmon Survey || — || align=right data-sort-value="0.96" | 960 m || 
|-id=584 bgcolor=#fefefe
| 371584 ||  || — || November 19, 2006 || Kitt Peak || Spacewatch || NYS || align=right data-sort-value="0.68" | 680 m || 
|-id=585 bgcolor=#fefefe
| 371585 ||  || — || November 16, 2006 || Kitt Peak || Spacewatch || — || align=right data-sort-value="0.82" | 820 m || 
|-id=586 bgcolor=#fefefe
| 371586 ||  || — || November 17, 2006 || Mount Lemmon || Mount Lemmon Survey || NYS || align=right data-sort-value="0.62" | 620 m || 
|-id=587 bgcolor=#fefefe
| 371587 ||  || — || November 19, 2006 || Kitt Peak || Spacewatch || — || align=right data-sort-value="0.92" | 920 m || 
|-id=588 bgcolor=#fefefe
| 371588 ||  || — || November 16, 2006 || Kitt Peak || Spacewatch || — || align=right data-sort-value="0.64" | 640 m || 
|-id=589 bgcolor=#fefefe
| 371589 ||  || — || November 16, 2006 || Kitt Peak || Spacewatch || — || align=right data-sort-value="0.96" | 960 m || 
|-id=590 bgcolor=#fefefe
| 371590 ||  || — || November 16, 2006 || Kitt Peak || Spacewatch || NYS || align=right data-sort-value="0.47" | 470 m || 
|-id=591 bgcolor=#fefefe
| 371591 ||  || — || November 2, 2006 || Mount Lemmon || Mount Lemmon Survey || — || align=right data-sort-value="0.85" | 850 m || 
|-id=592 bgcolor=#fefefe
| 371592 ||  || — || November 16, 2006 || Kitt Peak || Spacewatch || MAS || align=right data-sort-value="0.56" | 560 m || 
|-id=593 bgcolor=#fefefe
| 371593 ||  || — || November 18, 2006 || Kitt Peak || Spacewatch || NYS || align=right data-sort-value="0.73" | 730 m || 
|-id=594 bgcolor=#fefefe
| 371594 ||  || — || November 19, 2006 || Kitt Peak || Spacewatch || — || align=right data-sort-value="0.79" | 790 m || 
|-id=595 bgcolor=#fefefe
| 371595 ||  || — || November 19, 2006 || Socorro || LINEAR || MAS || align=right data-sort-value="0.85" | 850 m || 
|-id=596 bgcolor=#fefefe
| 371596 ||  || — || November 11, 2006 || Kitt Peak || Spacewatch || MAS || align=right data-sort-value="0.65" | 650 m || 
|-id=597 bgcolor=#fefefe
| 371597 ||  || — || November 11, 2006 || Kitt Peak || Spacewatch || NYS || align=right data-sort-value="0.75" | 750 m || 
|-id=598 bgcolor=#fefefe
| 371598 ||  || — || November 22, 2006 || Kitt Peak || Spacewatch || — || align=right | 1.0 km || 
|-id=599 bgcolor=#fefefe
| 371599 ||  || — || November 22, 2006 || Socorro || LINEAR || — || align=right | 1.1 km || 
|-id=600 bgcolor=#fefefe
| 371600 ||  || — || October 23, 2006 || Mount Lemmon || Mount Lemmon Survey || MAS || align=right data-sort-value="0.90" | 900 m || 
|}

371601–371700 

|-bgcolor=#E9E9E9
| 371601 ||  || — || November 20, 2006 || Kitt Peak || Spacewatch || — || align=right data-sort-value="0.90" | 900 m || 
|-id=602 bgcolor=#fefefe
| 371602 ||  || — || October 28, 2006 || Mount Lemmon || Mount Lemmon Survey || MAS || align=right data-sort-value="0.56" | 560 m || 
|-id=603 bgcolor=#fefefe
| 371603 ||  || — || November 20, 2006 || Kitt Peak || Spacewatch || NYS || align=right data-sort-value="0.73" | 730 m || 
|-id=604 bgcolor=#fefefe
| 371604 ||  || — || October 23, 2006 || Mount Lemmon || Mount Lemmon Survey || — || align=right data-sort-value="0.99" | 990 m || 
|-id=605 bgcolor=#fefefe
| 371605 ||  || — || November 23, 2006 || Kitt Peak || Spacewatch || MAS || align=right data-sort-value="0.64" | 640 m || 
|-id=606 bgcolor=#fefefe
| 371606 ||  || — || November 23, 2006 || Kitt Peak || Spacewatch || MAS || align=right data-sort-value="0.61" | 610 m || 
|-id=607 bgcolor=#fefefe
| 371607 ||  || — || November 24, 2006 || Mount Lemmon || Mount Lemmon Survey || NYS || align=right data-sort-value="0.62" | 620 m || 
|-id=608 bgcolor=#fefefe
| 371608 ||  || — || December 8, 2006 || Palomar || NEAT || — || align=right data-sort-value="0.89" | 890 m || 
|-id=609 bgcolor=#fefefe
| 371609 ||  || — || December 9, 2006 || Kitt Peak || Spacewatch || — || align=right | 1.1 km || 
|-id=610 bgcolor=#fefefe
| 371610 ||  || — || December 10, 2006 || Kitt Peak || Spacewatch || MAS || align=right data-sort-value="0.95" | 950 m || 
|-id=611 bgcolor=#fefefe
| 371611 ||  || — || December 11, 2006 || Kitt Peak || Spacewatch || MAS || align=right data-sort-value="0.87" | 870 m || 
|-id=612 bgcolor=#fefefe
| 371612 ||  || — || December 12, 2006 || Catalina || CSS || — || align=right data-sort-value="0.87" | 870 m || 
|-id=613 bgcolor=#fefefe
| 371613 ||  || — || December 12, 2006 || Mount Lemmon || Mount Lemmon Survey || MAS || align=right data-sort-value="0.71" | 710 m || 
|-id=614 bgcolor=#fefefe
| 371614 ||  || — || December 12, 2006 || Mount Lemmon || Mount Lemmon Survey || V || align=right data-sort-value="0.68" | 680 m || 
|-id=615 bgcolor=#fefefe
| 371615 ||  || — || November 14, 2006 || Mount Lemmon || Mount Lemmon Survey || NYS || align=right data-sort-value="0.75" | 750 m || 
|-id=616 bgcolor=#fefefe
| 371616 ||  || — || December 14, 2006 || Mount Lemmon || Mount Lemmon Survey || — || align=right | 1.1 km || 
|-id=617 bgcolor=#fefefe
| 371617 ||  || — || December 14, 2006 || Kitt Peak || Spacewatch || — || align=right data-sort-value="0.98" | 980 m || 
|-id=618 bgcolor=#E9E9E9
| 371618 ||  || — || December 15, 2006 || Mount Lemmon || Mount Lemmon Survey || — || align=right | 1.1 km || 
|-id=619 bgcolor=#E9E9E9
| 371619 ||  || — || December 13, 2006 || Mount Lemmon || Mount Lemmon Survey || — || align=right | 1.2 km || 
|-id=620 bgcolor=#fefefe
| 371620 ||  || — || December 22, 2006 || Socorro || LINEAR || — || align=right | 1.1 km || 
|-id=621 bgcolor=#E9E9E9
| 371621 ||  || — || December 21, 2006 || Kitt Peak || Spacewatch || — || align=right | 1.1 km || 
|-id=622 bgcolor=#E9E9E9
| 371622 ||  || — || December 21, 2006 || Kitt Peak || Spacewatch || — || align=right | 1.8 km || 
|-id=623 bgcolor=#E9E9E9
| 371623 ||  || — || December 21, 2006 || Kitt Peak || Spacewatch || — || align=right | 1.1 km || 
|-id=624 bgcolor=#E9E9E9
| 371624 ||  || — || December 21, 2006 || Kitt Peak || Spacewatch || — || align=right data-sort-value="0.87" | 870 m || 
|-id=625 bgcolor=#fefefe
| 371625 ||  || — || December 22, 2006 || Kitt Peak || Spacewatch || — || align=right | 1.00 km || 
|-id=626 bgcolor=#fefefe
| 371626 ||  || — || December 21, 2006 || Kitt Peak || M. W. Buie || NYS || align=right data-sort-value="0.64" | 640 m || 
|-id=627 bgcolor=#E9E9E9
| 371627 ||  || — || January 9, 2007 || Mount Lemmon || Mount Lemmon Survey || — || align=right data-sort-value="0.76" | 760 m || 
|-id=628 bgcolor=#E9E9E9
| 371628 ||  || — || January 10, 2007 || Nyukasa || Mount Nyukasa Stn. || — || align=right data-sort-value="0.97" | 970 m || 
|-id=629 bgcolor=#fefefe
| 371629 ||  || — || November 18, 2006 || Mount Lemmon || Mount Lemmon Survey || NYS || align=right data-sort-value="0.63" | 630 m || 
|-id=630 bgcolor=#E9E9E9
| 371630 ||  || — || January 9, 2007 || Kitt Peak || Spacewatch || — || align=right | 1.4 km || 
|-id=631 bgcolor=#E9E9E9
| 371631 ||  || — || January 10, 2007 || Mount Lemmon || Mount Lemmon Survey || — || align=right | 1.1 km || 
|-id=632 bgcolor=#fefefe
| 371632 ||  || — || January 10, 2007 || Mount Lemmon || Mount Lemmon Survey || NYS || align=right data-sort-value="0.77" | 770 m || 
|-id=633 bgcolor=#fefefe
| 371633 ||  || — || January 13, 2007 || Socorro || LINEAR || NYS || align=right data-sort-value="0.90" | 900 m || 
|-id=634 bgcolor=#fefefe
| 371634 ||  || — || January 15, 2007 || Anderson Mesa || LONEOS || NYS || align=right data-sort-value="0.96" | 960 m || 
|-id=635 bgcolor=#E9E9E9
| 371635 ||  || — || January 16, 2007 || Catalina || CSS || — || align=right | 1.8 km || 
|-id=636 bgcolor=#fefefe
| 371636 ||  || — || January 17, 2007 || Palomar || NEAT || — || align=right | 1.2 km || 
|-id=637 bgcolor=#fefefe
| 371637 ||  || — || January 24, 2007 || Mount Lemmon || Mount Lemmon Survey || — || align=right | 1.0 km || 
|-id=638 bgcolor=#fefefe
| 371638 ||  || — || January 17, 2007 || Kitt Peak || Spacewatch || NYS || align=right data-sort-value="0.86" | 860 m || 
|-id=639 bgcolor=#E9E9E9
| 371639 ||  || — || January 8, 2007 || Kitt Peak || Spacewatch || RAF || align=right | 1.0 km || 
|-id=640 bgcolor=#E9E9E9
| 371640 ||  || — || January 18, 2007 || Palomar || NEAT || — || align=right | 1.6 km || 
|-id=641 bgcolor=#fefefe
| 371641 ||  || — || January 24, 2007 || Catalina || CSS || — || align=right data-sort-value="0.97" | 970 m || 
|-id=642 bgcolor=#E9E9E9
| 371642 ||  || — || January 24, 2007 || Catalina || CSS || — || align=right | 1.2 km || 
|-id=643 bgcolor=#E9E9E9
| 371643 ||  || — || January 24, 2007 || Mount Lemmon || Mount Lemmon Survey || — || align=right | 1.1 km || 
|-id=644 bgcolor=#E9E9E9
| 371644 ||  || — || January 24, 2007 || Mount Lemmon || Mount Lemmon Survey || — || align=right | 1.3 km || 
|-id=645 bgcolor=#fefefe
| 371645 ||  || — || September 27, 1994 || Kitt Peak || Spacewatch || NYS || align=right data-sort-value="0.71" | 710 m || 
|-id=646 bgcolor=#E9E9E9
| 371646 ||  || — || January 24, 2007 || Socorro || LINEAR || — || align=right | 1.9 km || 
|-id=647 bgcolor=#E9E9E9
| 371647 ||  || — || January 24, 2007 || Socorro || LINEAR || — || align=right | 2.1 km || 
|-id=648 bgcolor=#E9E9E9
| 371648 ||  || — || January 10, 2007 || Mount Lemmon || Mount Lemmon Survey || — || align=right | 1.6 km || 
|-id=649 bgcolor=#E9E9E9
| 371649 ||  || — || January 27, 2007 || Mount Lemmon || Mount Lemmon Survey || — || align=right data-sort-value="0.99" | 990 m || 
|-id=650 bgcolor=#E9E9E9
| 371650 ||  || — || January 27, 2007 || Mount Lemmon || Mount Lemmon Survey || — || align=right data-sort-value="0.87" | 870 m || 
|-id=651 bgcolor=#E9E9E9
| 371651 ||  || — || January 27, 2007 || Kitt Peak || Spacewatch || — || align=right data-sort-value="0.97" | 970 m || 
|-id=652 bgcolor=#fefefe
| 371652 ||  || — || January 26, 2007 || Kitt Peak || Spacewatch || NYS || align=right data-sort-value="0.75" | 750 m || 
|-id=653 bgcolor=#E9E9E9
| 371653 ||  || — || January 27, 2007 || Mount Lemmon || Mount Lemmon Survey || — || align=right | 2.2 km || 
|-id=654 bgcolor=#E9E9E9
| 371654 ||  || — || January 19, 2007 || Mauna Kea || Mauna Kea Obs. || — || align=right data-sort-value="0.94" | 940 m || 
|-id=655 bgcolor=#E9E9E9
| 371655 ||  || — || January 17, 2007 || Kitt Peak || Spacewatch || — || align=right data-sort-value="0.89" | 890 m || 
|-id=656 bgcolor=#E9E9E9
| 371656 ||  || — || February 6, 2007 || Kitt Peak || Spacewatch || — || align=right | 1.8 km || 
|-id=657 bgcolor=#E9E9E9
| 371657 ||  || — || February 6, 2007 || Kitt Peak || Spacewatch || — || align=right | 3.0 km || 
|-id=658 bgcolor=#E9E9E9
| 371658 ||  || — || January 17, 2007 || Mount Lemmon || Mount Lemmon Survey || — || align=right | 1.9 km || 
|-id=659 bgcolor=#E9E9E9
| 371659 ||  || — || January 24, 2007 || Catalina || CSS || HNS || align=right | 1.2 km || 
|-id=660 bgcolor=#FFC2E0
| 371660 ||  || — || February 10, 2007 || Mount Lemmon || Mount Lemmon Survey || APOPHA || align=right data-sort-value="0.23" | 230 m || 
|-id=661 bgcolor=#E9E9E9
| 371661 ||  || — || February 6, 2007 || Palomar || NEAT || BRG || align=right | 1.3 km || 
|-id=662 bgcolor=#E9E9E9
| 371662 ||  || — || February 6, 2007 || Mount Lemmon || Mount Lemmon Survey || AEO || align=right | 1.4 km || 
|-id=663 bgcolor=#E9E9E9
| 371663 ||  || — || January 10, 2007 || Mount Lemmon || Mount Lemmon Survey || — || align=right | 1.5 km || 
|-id=664 bgcolor=#E9E9E9
| 371664 ||  || — || February 7, 2007 || Kitt Peak || Spacewatch || — || align=right | 2.5 km || 
|-id=665 bgcolor=#E9E9E9
| 371665 ||  || — || February 9, 2007 || Kitt Peak || Spacewatch || — || align=right | 1.6 km || 
|-id=666 bgcolor=#E9E9E9
| 371666 ||  || — || February 10, 2007 || Mount Lemmon || Mount Lemmon Survey || MAR || align=right | 1.2 km || 
|-id=667 bgcolor=#E9E9E9
| 371667 ||  || — || February 7, 2007 || Catalina || CSS || KRM || align=right | 2.3 km || 
|-id=668 bgcolor=#E9E9E9
| 371668 ||  || — || February 10, 2007 || Catalina || CSS || — || align=right | 2.3 km || 
|-id=669 bgcolor=#E9E9E9
| 371669 ||  || — || February 13, 2007 || Socorro || LINEAR || — || align=right | 1.8 km || 
|-id=670 bgcolor=#E9E9E9
| 371670 ||  || — || November 21, 2006 || Mount Lemmon || Mount Lemmon Survey || MAR || align=right | 1.4 km || 
|-id=671 bgcolor=#E9E9E9
| 371671 ||  || — || February 10, 2007 || Catalina || CSS || — || align=right | 1.6 km || 
|-id=672 bgcolor=#E9E9E9
| 371672 ||  || — || February 15, 2007 || Catalina || CSS || EUN || align=right | 1.6 km || 
|-id=673 bgcolor=#E9E9E9
| 371673 ||  || — || February 17, 2007 || Kitt Peak || Spacewatch || — || align=right | 2.1 km || 
|-id=674 bgcolor=#E9E9E9
| 371674 ||  || — || February 16, 2007 || Palomar || NEAT || — || align=right data-sort-value="0.96" | 960 m || 
|-id=675 bgcolor=#fefefe
| 371675 ||  || — || February 16, 2007 || Mount Lemmon || Mount Lemmon Survey || H || align=right data-sort-value="0.54" | 540 m || 
|-id=676 bgcolor=#E9E9E9
| 371676 ||  || — || February 16, 2007 || Palomar || NEAT || — || align=right | 2.5 km || 
|-id=677 bgcolor=#E9E9E9
| 371677 ||  || — || February 16, 2007 || Palomar || NEAT || — || align=right | 1.1 km || 
|-id=678 bgcolor=#E9E9E9
| 371678 ||  || — || January 24, 2007 || Socorro || LINEAR || — || align=right | 2.4 km || 
|-id=679 bgcolor=#E9E9E9
| 371679 ||  || — || February 17, 2007 || Kitt Peak || Spacewatch || — || align=right | 1.7 km || 
|-id=680 bgcolor=#E9E9E9
| 371680 ||  || — || February 17, 2007 || Palomar || NEAT || — || align=right | 1.8 km || 
|-id=681 bgcolor=#E9E9E9
| 371681 ||  || — || January 27, 2007 || Mount Lemmon || Mount Lemmon Survey || — || align=right data-sort-value="0.97" | 970 m || 
|-id=682 bgcolor=#C2FFFF
| 371682 ||  || — || February 17, 2007 || Kitt Peak || Spacewatch || L5 || align=right | 10 km || 
|-id=683 bgcolor=#E9E9E9
| 371683 ||  || — || February 17, 2007 || Kitt Peak || Spacewatch || — || align=right | 1.7 km || 
|-id=684 bgcolor=#E9E9E9
| 371684 ||  || — || February 17, 2007 || Kitt Peak || Spacewatch || — || align=right data-sort-value="0.94" | 940 m || 
|-id=685 bgcolor=#E9E9E9
| 371685 ||  || — || February 17, 2007 || Kitt Peak || Spacewatch || — || align=right data-sort-value="0.86" | 860 m || 
|-id=686 bgcolor=#E9E9E9
| 371686 ||  || — || February 16, 2007 || Catalina || CSS || — || align=right | 2.5 km || 
|-id=687 bgcolor=#E9E9E9
| 371687 ||  || — || February 19, 2007 || Mount Lemmon || Mount Lemmon Survey || — || align=right | 1.7 km || 
|-id=688 bgcolor=#E9E9E9
| 371688 ||  || — || February 21, 2007 || Mount Lemmon || Mount Lemmon Survey || — || align=right data-sort-value="0.78" | 780 m || 
|-id=689 bgcolor=#E9E9E9
| 371689 ||  || — || February 21, 2007 || Mount Lemmon || Mount Lemmon Survey || — || align=right | 1.5 km || 
|-id=690 bgcolor=#E9E9E9
| 371690 ||  || — || February 21, 2007 || Mount Lemmon || Mount Lemmon Survey || BRU || align=right | 1.3 km || 
|-id=691 bgcolor=#E9E9E9
| 371691 ||  || — || February 22, 2007 || Kitt Peak || Spacewatch || — || align=right | 1.1 km || 
|-id=692 bgcolor=#fefefe
| 371692 ||  || — || February 13, 2007 || Socorro || LINEAR || H || align=right data-sort-value="0.82" | 820 m || 
|-id=693 bgcolor=#E9E9E9
| 371693 ||  || — || February 21, 2007 || Kitt Peak || Spacewatch || — || align=right | 1.8 km || 
|-id=694 bgcolor=#E9E9E9
| 371694 ||  || — || February 21, 2007 || Socorro || LINEAR || EUN || align=right | 1.6 km || 
|-id=695 bgcolor=#E9E9E9
| 371695 ||  || — || January 28, 2007 || Mount Lemmon || Mount Lemmon Survey || — || align=right | 2.4 km || 
|-id=696 bgcolor=#E9E9E9
| 371696 ||  || — || February 23, 2007 || Kitt Peak || Spacewatch || — || align=right data-sort-value="0.77" | 770 m || 
|-id=697 bgcolor=#E9E9E9
| 371697 ||  || — || February 25, 2007 || Mount Lemmon || Mount Lemmon Survey || — || align=right | 1.6 km || 
|-id=698 bgcolor=#E9E9E9
| 371698 ||  || — || February 16, 2007 || Mount Lemmon || Mount Lemmon Survey || — || align=right | 2.6 km || 
|-id=699 bgcolor=#E9E9E9
| 371699 ||  || — || February 17, 2007 || Mount Lemmon || Mount Lemmon Survey || — || align=right | 1.3 km || 
|-id=700 bgcolor=#E9E9E9
| 371700 ||  || — || March 9, 2007 || Palomar || NEAT || — || align=right data-sort-value="0.85" | 850 m || 
|}

371701–371800 

|-bgcolor=#E9E9E9
| 371701 ||  || — || February 21, 2007 || Mount Lemmon || Mount Lemmon Survey || AEO || align=right | 1.4 km || 
|-id=702 bgcolor=#E9E9E9
| 371702 ||  || — || March 9, 2007 || Kitt Peak || Spacewatch || — || align=right | 1.8 km || 
|-id=703 bgcolor=#E9E9E9
| 371703 ||  || — || March 10, 2007 || Kitt Peak || Spacewatch || — || align=right | 1.2 km || 
|-id=704 bgcolor=#E9E9E9
| 371704 ||  || — || March 10, 2007 || Kitt Peak || Spacewatch || WIT || align=right | 1.1 km || 
|-id=705 bgcolor=#E9E9E9
| 371705 ||  || — || March 9, 2007 || Catalina || CSS || INO || align=right | 1.4 km || 
|-id=706 bgcolor=#E9E9E9
| 371706 ||  || — || March 9, 2007 || Palomar || NEAT || HNS || align=right | 1.6 km || 
|-id=707 bgcolor=#E9E9E9
| 371707 ||  || — || December 27, 2006 || Mount Lemmon || Mount Lemmon Survey || INO || align=right | 1.3 km || 
|-id=708 bgcolor=#E9E9E9
| 371708 ||  || — || February 17, 2007 || Socorro || LINEAR || — || align=right | 2.3 km || 
|-id=709 bgcolor=#E9E9E9
| 371709 ||  || — || March 9, 2007 || Palomar || NEAT || — || align=right data-sort-value="0.98" | 980 m || 
|-id=710 bgcolor=#E9E9E9
| 371710 ||  || — || March 9, 2007 || Kitt Peak || Spacewatch || — || align=right | 2.3 km || 
|-id=711 bgcolor=#E9E9E9
| 371711 ||  || — || March 9, 2007 || Kitt Peak || Spacewatch || — || align=right | 2.6 km || 
|-id=712 bgcolor=#E9E9E9
| 371712 ||  || — || March 9, 2007 || Kitt Peak || Spacewatch || — || align=right | 2.3 km || 
|-id=713 bgcolor=#E9E9E9
| 371713 ||  || — || March 9, 2007 || Mount Lemmon || Mount Lemmon Survey || RAF || align=right data-sort-value="0.94" | 940 m || 
|-id=714 bgcolor=#E9E9E9
| 371714 ||  || — || March 9, 2007 || Kitt Peak || Spacewatch || — || align=right | 2.3 km || 
|-id=715 bgcolor=#E9E9E9
| 371715 ||  || — || March 12, 2007 || Mount Lemmon || Mount Lemmon Survey || — || align=right | 1.6 km || 
|-id=716 bgcolor=#E9E9E9
| 371716 ||  || — || February 17, 2007 || Kitt Peak || Spacewatch || — || align=right | 2.4 km || 
|-id=717 bgcolor=#E9E9E9
| 371717 ||  || — || February 17, 2007 || Kitt Peak || Spacewatch || AER || align=right | 1.2 km || 
|-id=718 bgcolor=#E9E9E9
| 371718 ||  || — || March 10, 2007 || Kitt Peak || Spacewatch || — || align=right | 2.2 km || 
|-id=719 bgcolor=#E9E9E9
| 371719 ||  || — || March 10, 2007 || Kitt Peak || Spacewatch || — || align=right | 2.8 km || 
|-id=720 bgcolor=#E9E9E9
| 371720 ||  || — || February 17, 2007 || Catalina || CSS || — || align=right | 1.7 km || 
|-id=721 bgcolor=#E9E9E9
| 371721 ||  || — || March 12, 2007 || Mount Lemmon || Mount Lemmon Survey || NEM || align=right | 2.2 km || 
|-id=722 bgcolor=#E9E9E9
| 371722 ||  || — || March 12, 2007 || Mount Lemmon || Mount Lemmon Survey || — || align=right | 1.5 km || 
|-id=723 bgcolor=#E9E9E9
| 371723 ||  || — || March 12, 2007 || Mount Lemmon || Mount Lemmon Survey || BAR || align=right | 1.6 km || 
|-id=724 bgcolor=#E9E9E9
| 371724 ||  || — || March 12, 2007 || Mount Lemmon || Mount Lemmon Survey || HNS || align=right | 1.5 km || 
|-id=725 bgcolor=#E9E9E9
| 371725 ||  || — || March 13, 2007 || Saint-Sulpice || B. Christophe || — || align=right | 3.3 km || 
|-id=726 bgcolor=#E9E9E9
| 371726 ||  || — || March 11, 2007 || Kitt Peak || Spacewatch || — || align=right | 1.4 km || 
|-id=727 bgcolor=#E9E9E9
| 371727 ||  || — || March 11, 2007 || Kitt Peak || Spacewatch || ADE || align=right | 2.1 km || 
|-id=728 bgcolor=#E9E9E9
| 371728 ||  || — || March 11, 2007 || Mount Lemmon || Mount Lemmon Survey || — || align=right data-sort-value="0.86" | 860 m || 
|-id=729 bgcolor=#E9E9E9
| 371729 ||  || — || March 11, 2007 || Anderson Mesa || LONEOS || — || align=right | 3.4 km || 
|-id=730 bgcolor=#E9E9E9
| 371730 ||  || — || March 9, 2007 || Mount Lemmon || Mount Lemmon Survey || — || align=right data-sort-value="0.76" | 760 m || 
|-id=731 bgcolor=#E9E9E9
| 371731 ||  || — || March 9, 2007 || Mount Lemmon || Mount Lemmon Survey || — || align=right | 2.9 km || 
|-id=732 bgcolor=#E9E9E9
| 371732 ||  || — || March 9, 2007 || Mount Lemmon || Mount Lemmon Survey || — || align=right | 1.6 km || 
|-id=733 bgcolor=#E9E9E9
| 371733 ||  || — || February 9, 2007 || Kitt Peak || Spacewatch || — || align=right | 2.0 km || 
|-id=734 bgcolor=#E9E9E9
| 371734 ||  || — || March 12, 2007 || Kitt Peak || Spacewatch || HEN || align=right | 1.2 km || 
|-id=735 bgcolor=#E9E9E9
| 371735 ||  || — || March 12, 2007 || Mount Lemmon || Mount Lemmon Survey || XIZ || align=right | 1.4 km || 
|-id=736 bgcolor=#E9E9E9
| 371736 ||  || — || March 12, 2007 || Mount Lemmon || Mount Lemmon Survey || — || align=right | 2.0 km || 
|-id=737 bgcolor=#d6d6d6
| 371737 ||  || — || March 12, 2007 || Kitt Peak || Spacewatch || — || align=right | 2.5 km || 
|-id=738 bgcolor=#E9E9E9
| 371738 ||  || — || March 13, 2007 || Kitt Peak || Spacewatch || AGN || align=right | 1.1 km || 
|-id=739 bgcolor=#E9E9E9
| 371739 ||  || — || March 11, 2007 || Mount Lemmon || Mount Lemmon Survey || ADE || align=right | 2.0 km || 
|-id=740 bgcolor=#E9E9E9
| 371740 ||  || — || March 13, 2007 || Črni Vrh || Črni Vrh || BAR || align=right | 1.8 km || 
|-id=741 bgcolor=#d6d6d6
| 371741 ||  || — || March 11, 2007 || Kitt Peak || Spacewatch || — || align=right | 2.7 km || 
|-id=742 bgcolor=#E9E9E9
| 371742 ||  || — || February 23, 2007 || Kitt Peak || Spacewatch || — || align=right data-sort-value="0.89" | 890 m || 
|-id=743 bgcolor=#C2FFFF
| 371743 ||  || — || March 14, 2007 || Kitt Peak || Spacewatch || L5 || align=right | 9.0 km || 
|-id=744 bgcolor=#E9E9E9
| 371744 ||  || — || March 15, 2007 || Kitt Peak || Spacewatch || — || align=right | 2.1 km || 
|-id=745 bgcolor=#E9E9E9
| 371745 ||  || — || March 10, 2007 || Mount Lemmon || Mount Lemmon Survey || HNS || align=right | 1.2 km || 
|-id=746 bgcolor=#E9E9E9
| 371746 ||  || — || March 10, 2007 || Mount Lemmon || Mount Lemmon Survey || WIT || align=right | 1.2 km || 
|-id=747 bgcolor=#E9E9E9
| 371747 ||  || — || March 13, 2007 || Kitt Peak || Spacewatch || — || align=right | 1.4 km || 
|-id=748 bgcolor=#fefefe
| 371748 ||  || — || March 10, 2007 || Palomar || NEAT || H || align=right data-sort-value="0.61" | 610 m || 
|-id=749 bgcolor=#E9E9E9
| 371749 ||  || — || March 12, 2007 || Catalina || CSS || HNS || align=right | 1.6 km || 
|-id=750 bgcolor=#E9E9E9
| 371750 ||  || — || March 14, 2007 || Mount Lemmon || Mount Lemmon Survey || — || align=right | 3.5 km || 
|-id=751 bgcolor=#E9E9E9
| 371751 ||  || — || March 18, 2007 || Pla D'Arguines || R. Ferrando || — || align=right | 3.0 km || 
|-id=752 bgcolor=#E9E9E9
| 371752 ||  || — || March 20, 2007 || Mount Lemmon || Mount Lemmon Survey || — || align=right data-sort-value="0.76" | 760 m || 
|-id=753 bgcolor=#E9E9E9
| 371753 ||  || — || February 22, 2007 || Kitt Peak || Spacewatch || — || align=right | 2.7 km || 
|-id=754 bgcolor=#E9E9E9
| 371754 ||  || — || March 20, 2007 || Kitt Peak || Spacewatch || — || align=right | 1.5 km || 
|-id=755 bgcolor=#E9E9E9
| 371755 ||  || — || March 20, 2007 || Kitt Peak || Spacewatch || WIT || align=right | 1.2 km || 
|-id=756 bgcolor=#E9E9E9
| 371756 ||  || — || March 25, 2007 || Altschwendt || W. Ries || — || align=right | 2.9 km || 
|-id=757 bgcolor=#d6d6d6
| 371757 ||  || — || March 26, 2007 || Mount Lemmon || Mount Lemmon Survey || — || align=right | 2.6 km || 
|-id=758 bgcolor=#E9E9E9
| 371758 ||  || — || March 20, 2007 || Mount Lemmon || Mount Lemmon Survey || — || align=right | 1.7 km || 
|-id=759 bgcolor=#E9E9E9
| 371759 ||  || — || March 26, 2007 || Mount Lemmon || Mount Lemmon Survey || — || align=right | 1.4 km || 
|-id=760 bgcolor=#E9E9E9
| 371760 ||  || — || April 11, 2007 || Kitt Peak || Spacewatch || — || align=right | 2.5 km || 
|-id=761 bgcolor=#E9E9E9
| 371761 ||  || — || April 14, 2007 || Kitt Peak || Spacewatch || — || align=right | 1.5 km || 
|-id=762 bgcolor=#E9E9E9
| 371762 ||  || — || April 14, 2007 || Kitt Peak || Spacewatch || HOF || align=right | 2.5 km || 
|-id=763 bgcolor=#d6d6d6
| 371763 ||  || — || April 11, 2007 || Mount Lemmon || Mount Lemmon Survey || — || align=right | 2.3 km || 
|-id=764 bgcolor=#E9E9E9
| 371764 ||  || — || April 14, 2007 || Kitt Peak || Spacewatch || GEF || align=right | 1.5 km || 
|-id=765 bgcolor=#fefefe
| 371765 ||  || — || April 7, 2007 || Catalina || CSS || H || align=right data-sort-value="0.71" | 710 m || 
|-id=766 bgcolor=#E9E9E9
| 371766 ||  || — || September 22, 2004 || Kitt Peak || Spacewatch || HOF || align=right | 2.8 km || 
|-id=767 bgcolor=#E9E9E9
| 371767 ||  || — || April 15, 2007 || Kitt Peak || Spacewatch || PAD || align=right | 1.9 km || 
|-id=768 bgcolor=#E9E9E9
| 371768 ||  || — || April 15, 2007 || Kitt Peak || Spacewatch || — || align=right | 2.3 km || 
|-id=769 bgcolor=#E9E9E9
| 371769 ||  || — || April 16, 2007 || Mount Lemmon || Mount Lemmon Survey || — || align=right | 2.1 km || 
|-id=770 bgcolor=#E9E9E9
| 371770 ||  || — || April 18, 2007 || Mount Lemmon || Mount Lemmon Survey || NEM || align=right | 2.2 km || 
|-id=771 bgcolor=#d6d6d6
| 371771 ||  || — || March 18, 2007 || Kitt Peak || Spacewatch || — || align=right | 2.9 km || 
|-id=772 bgcolor=#E9E9E9
| 371772 ||  || — || April 14, 2007 || Kitt Peak || Spacewatch || — || align=right | 2.2 km || 
|-id=773 bgcolor=#E9E9E9
| 371773 ||  || — || April 18, 2007 || Kitt Peak || Spacewatch || — || align=right | 2.5 km || 
|-id=774 bgcolor=#d6d6d6
| 371774 ||  || — || April 15, 2007 || Kitt Peak || Spacewatch || — || align=right | 2.2 km || 
|-id=775 bgcolor=#E9E9E9
| 371775 ||  || — || April 19, 2007 || Kitt Peak || Spacewatch || WIT || align=right | 1.6 km || 
|-id=776 bgcolor=#E9E9E9
| 371776 ||  || — || April 20, 2007 || Mount Lemmon || Mount Lemmon Survey || — || align=right | 2.5 km || 
|-id=777 bgcolor=#E9E9E9
| 371777 ||  || — || April 24, 2007 || Tiki || S. F. Hönig, N. Teamo || — || align=right | 2.7 km || 
|-id=778 bgcolor=#d6d6d6
| 371778 ||  || — || April 19, 2007 || Kitt Peak || Spacewatch || KOR || align=right | 1.4 km || 
|-id=779 bgcolor=#d6d6d6
| 371779 ||  || — || April 22, 2007 || Kitt Peak || Spacewatch || CHA || align=right | 2.4 km || 
|-id=780 bgcolor=#E9E9E9
| 371780 ||  || — || April 19, 2007 || Kitt Peak || Spacewatch || — || align=right | 2.0 km || 
|-id=781 bgcolor=#E9E9E9
| 371781 ||  || — || May 10, 2007 || Mount Lemmon || Mount Lemmon Survey || HOF || align=right | 2.9 km || 
|-id=782 bgcolor=#d6d6d6
| 371782 ||  || — || May 24, 2007 || Mount Lemmon || Mount Lemmon Survey || EUP || align=right | 5.0 km || 
|-id=783 bgcolor=#E9E9E9
| 371783 ||  || — || June 9, 2007 || Kitt Peak || Spacewatch || GEF || align=right | 1.4 km || 
|-id=784 bgcolor=#d6d6d6
| 371784 ||  || — || June 15, 2007 || Kitt Peak || Spacewatch || — || align=right | 3.7 km || 
|-id=785 bgcolor=#d6d6d6
| 371785 ||  || — || April 25, 2007 || Mount Lemmon || Mount Lemmon Survey || — || align=right | 4.1 km || 
|-id=786 bgcolor=#d6d6d6
| 371786 ||  || — || June 17, 2007 || Kitt Peak || Spacewatch || EMA || align=right | 3.7 km || 
|-id=787 bgcolor=#d6d6d6
| 371787 ||  || — || June 22, 2007 || Kitt Peak || Spacewatch || — || align=right | 3.3 km || 
|-id=788 bgcolor=#d6d6d6
| 371788 || 2007 NS || — || July 9, 2007 || Eskridge || G. Hug || EOS || align=right | 2.2 km || 
|-id=789 bgcolor=#d6d6d6
| 371789 ||  || — || July 21, 2007 || Wrightwood || J. W. Young || LIX || align=right | 4.2 km || 
|-id=790 bgcolor=#FA8072
| 371790 ||  || — || July 21, 2007 || Tiki || S. F. Hönig, N. Teamo || — || align=right data-sort-value="0.57" | 570 m || 
|-id=791 bgcolor=#d6d6d6
| 371791 ||  || — || July 22, 2007 || Lulin Observatory || LUSS || — || align=right | 6.1 km || 
|-id=792 bgcolor=#d6d6d6
| 371792 ||  || — || August 5, 2007 || Črni Vrh || Črni Vrh || EUP || align=right | 4.6 km || 
|-id=793 bgcolor=#d6d6d6
| 371793 ||  || — || August 10, 2007 || Tiki || S. F. Hönig, N. Teamo || EUP || align=right | 8.0 km || 
|-id=794 bgcolor=#d6d6d6
| 371794 ||  || — || August 8, 2007 || Socorro || LINEAR || — || align=right | 4.9 km || 
|-id=795 bgcolor=#d6d6d6
| 371795 ||  || — || August 11, 2007 || Socorro || LINEAR || — || align=right | 3.7 km || 
|-id=796 bgcolor=#d6d6d6
| 371796 ||  || — || August 16, 2007 || Socorro || LINEAR || — || align=right | 3.6 km || 
|-id=797 bgcolor=#FA8072
| 371797 ||  || — || August 21, 2007 || Siding Spring || SSS || — || align=right | 1.7 km || 
|-id=798 bgcolor=#d6d6d6
| 371798 ||  || — || September 3, 2007 || Catalina || CSS || — || align=right | 5.1 km || 
|-id=799 bgcolor=#d6d6d6
| 371799 ||  || — || September 12, 2007 || Gaisberg || R. Gierlinger || VER || align=right | 2.8 km || 
|-id=800 bgcolor=#d6d6d6
| 371800 ||  || — || September 3, 2007 || Catalina || CSS || — || align=right | 4.5 km || 
|}

371801–371900 

|-bgcolor=#d6d6d6
| 371801 ||  || — || September 8, 2007 || Anderson Mesa || LONEOS || TIR || align=right | 3.7 km || 
|-id=802 bgcolor=#d6d6d6
| 371802 ||  || — || September 9, 2007 || Kitt Peak || Spacewatch || 7:4 || align=right | 3.9 km || 
|-id=803 bgcolor=#fefefe
| 371803 ||  || — || September 9, 2007 || Kitt Peak || Spacewatch || — || align=right data-sort-value="0.71" | 710 m || 
|-id=804 bgcolor=#d6d6d6
| 371804 ||  || — || September 10, 2007 || Kitt Peak || Spacewatch || TIR || align=right | 5.5 km || 
|-id=805 bgcolor=#d6d6d6
| 371805 ||  || — || September 12, 2007 || Siding Spring || SSS || EUP || align=right | 5.4 km || 
|-id=806 bgcolor=#d6d6d6
| 371806 ||  || — || September 10, 2007 || Kitt Peak || Spacewatch || HYG || align=right | 2.7 km || 
|-id=807 bgcolor=#d6d6d6
| 371807 ||  || — || September 11, 2007 || Catalina || CSS || — || align=right | 4.5 km || 
|-id=808 bgcolor=#fefefe
| 371808 ||  || — || September 10, 2007 || Mount Lemmon || Mount Lemmon Survey || — || align=right data-sort-value="0.77" | 770 m || 
|-id=809 bgcolor=#d6d6d6
| 371809 ||  || — || September 11, 2007 || Kitt Peak || Spacewatch || — || align=right | 5.4 km || 
|-id=810 bgcolor=#d6d6d6
| 371810 ||  || — || August 24, 2007 || Kitt Peak || Spacewatch || — || align=right | 3.0 km || 
|-id=811 bgcolor=#d6d6d6
| 371811 ||  || — || October 4, 2007 || Mount Lemmon || Mount Lemmon Survey || EUP || align=right | 3.9 km || 
|-id=812 bgcolor=#d6d6d6
| 371812 ||  || — || October 5, 2007 || Kitt Peak || Spacewatch || 7:4 || align=right | 5.6 km || 
|-id=813 bgcolor=#d6d6d6
| 371813 ||  || — || October 7, 2007 || Mount Lemmon || Mount Lemmon Survey || 7:4 || align=right | 4.0 km || 
|-id=814 bgcolor=#fefefe
| 371814 ||  || — || October 7, 2007 || Mount Lemmon || Mount Lemmon Survey || — || align=right data-sort-value="0.57" | 570 m || 
|-id=815 bgcolor=#d6d6d6
| 371815 ||  || — || October 6, 2007 || Socorro || LINEAR || SYL7:4 || align=right | 6.6 km || 
|-id=816 bgcolor=#fefefe
| 371816 ||  || — || October 8, 2007 || Kitt Peak || Spacewatch || — || align=right data-sort-value="0.58" | 580 m || 
|-id=817 bgcolor=#d6d6d6
| 371817 ||  || — || October 13, 2007 || Catalina || CSS || — || align=right | 5.4 km || 
|-id=818 bgcolor=#d6d6d6
| 371818 ||  || — || August 16, 2007 || XuYi || PMO NEO || Tj (2.94) || align=right | 3.1 km || 
|-id=819 bgcolor=#d6d6d6
| 371819 ||  || — || September 9, 2007 || Kitt Peak || Spacewatch || — || align=right | 3.4 km || 
|-id=820 bgcolor=#E9E9E9
| 371820 ||  || — || October 16, 2007 || Mount Lemmon || Mount Lemmon Survey || — || align=right | 2.7 km || 
|-id=821 bgcolor=#d6d6d6
| 371821 ||  || — || October 19, 2007 || Mount Lemmon || Mount Lemmon Survey || TIR || align=right | 3.3 km || 
|-id=822 bgcolor=#fefefe
| 371822 ||  || — || May 6, 2006 || Mount Lemmon || Mount Lemmon Survey || — || align=right data-sort-value="0.67" | 670 m || 
|-id=823 bgcolor=#fefefe
| 371823 ||  || — || October 24, 2007 || Mount Lemmon || Mount Lemmon Survey || — || align=right | 1.2 km || 
|-id=824 bgcolor=#fefefe
| 371824 ||  || — || October 11, 2007 || Kitt Peak || Spacewatch || FLO || align=right data-sort-value="0.62" | 620 m || 
|-id=825 bgcolor=#fefefe
| 371825 ||  || — || October 20, 2007 || Mount Lemmon || Mount Lemmon Survey || — || align=right data-sort-value="0.75" | 750 m || 
|-id=826 bgcolor=#fefefe
| 371826 ||  || — || October 20, 2007 || Mount Lemmon || Mount Lemmon Survey || — || align=right data-sort-value="0.52" | 520 m || 
|-id=827 bgcolor=#FA8072
| 371827 ||  || — || October 20, 2007 || Mount Lemmon || Mount Lemmon Survey || — || align=right data-sort-value="0.56" | 560 m || 
|-id=828 bgcolor=#d6d6d6
| 371828 ||  || — || November 3, 2007 || Dauban || Chante-Perdrix Obs. || — || align=right | 6.2 km || 
|-id=829 bgcolor=#d6d6d6
| 371829 ||  || — || November 3, 2007 || Mount Lemmon || Mount Lemmon Survey || EUP || align=right | 4.6 km || 
|-id=830 bgcolor=#fefefe
| 371830 ||  || — || November 1, 2007 || Kitt Peak || Spacewatch || — || align=right data-sort-value="0.62" | 620 m || 
|-id=831 bgcolor=#fefefe
| 371831 ||  || — || November 1, 2007 || Kitt Peak || Spacewatch || — || align=right data-sort-value="0.73" | 730 m || 
|-id=832 bgcolor=#fefefe
| 371832 ||  || — || November 7, 2007 || Kitt Peak || Spacewatch || — || align=right data-sort-value="0.49" | 490 m || 
|-id=833 bgcolor=#fefefe
| 371833 ||  || — || November 11, 2007 || Mount Lemmon || Mount Lemmon Survey || — || align=right data-sort-value="0.68" | 680 m || 
|-id=834 bgcolor=#d6d6d6
| 371834 ||  || — || November 8, 2007 || Catalina || CSS || SYL7:4 || align=right | 7.0 km || 
|-id=835 bgcolor=#fefefe
| 371835 ||  || — || November 2, 2007 || Kitt Peak || Spacewatch || — || align=right data-sort-value="0.59" | 590 m || 
|-id=836 bgcolor=#fefefe
| 371836 ||  || — || November 11, 2007 || Mount Lemmon || Mount Lemmon Survey || V || align=right data-sort-value="0.86" | 860 m || 
|-id=837 bgcolor=#d6d6d6
| 371837 ||  || — || November 7, 2007 || Kitt Peak || Spacewatch || 3:2 || align=right | 9.7 km || 
|-id=838 bgcolor=#fefefe
| 371838 ||  || — || November 8, 2007 || Kitt Peak || Spacewatch || — || align=right data-sort-value="0.75" | 750 m || 
|-id=839 bgcolor=#fefefe
| 371839 ||  || — || November 14, 2007 || Kitt Peak || Spacewatch || — || align=right data-sort-value="0.72" | 720 m || 
|-id=840 bgcolor=#fefefe
| 371840 ||  || — || November 14, 2007 || Kitt Peak || Spacewatch || — || align=right data-sort-value="0.67" | 670 m || 
|-id=841 bgcolor=#fefefe
| 371841 ||  || — || November 3, 2007 || Kitt Peak || Spacewatch || — || align=right data-sort-value="0.49" | 490 m || 
|-id=842 bgcolor=#fefefe
| 371842 ||  || — || November 18, 2007 || Mount Lemmon || Mount Lemmon Survey || — || align=right data-sort-value="0.62" | 620 m || 
|-id=843 bgcolor=#fefefe
| 371843 ||  || — || December 15, 2007 || Dauban || Chante-Perdrix Obs. || FLO || align=right data-sort-value="0.91" | 910 m || 
|-id=844 bgcolor=#fefefe
| 371844 ||  || — || December 15, 2007 || Catalina || CSS || FLO || align=right data-sort-value="0.67" | 670 m || 
|-id=845 bgcolor=#fefefe
| 371845 ||  || — || December 15, 2007 || Kitt Peak || Spacewatch || FLO || align=right data-sort-value="0.55" | 550 m || 
|-id=846 bgcolor=#fefefe
| 371846 ||  || — || December 17, 2007 || Mount Lemmon || Mount Lemmon Survey || FLO || align=right data-sort-value="0.62" | 620 m || 
|-id=847 bgcolor=#fefefe
| 371847 ||  || — || December 17, 2007 || Mount Lemmon || Mount Lemmon Survey || — || align=right data-sort-value="0.88" | 880 m || 
|-id=848 bgcolor=#fefefe
| 371848 ||  || — || December 28, 2007 || Kitt Peak || Spacewatch || — || align=right data-sort-value="0.86" | 860 m || 
|-id=849 bgcolor=#fefefe
| 371849 ||  || — || December 30, 2007 || Mount Lemmon || Mount Lemmon Survey || — || align=right | 1.1 km || 
|-id=850 bgcolor=#fefefe
| 371850 ||  || — || December 28, 2007 || Kitt Peak || Spacewatch || NYS || align=right data-sort-value="0.71" | 710 m || 
|-id=851 bgcolor=#fefefe
| 371851 ||  || — || December 31, 2007 || Kitt Peak || Spacewatch || FLO || align=right data-sort-value="0.64" | 640 m || 
|-id=852 bgcolor=#E9E9E9
| 371852 ||  || — || December 17, 2007 || Mount Lemmon || Mount Lemmon Survey || JUN || align=right | 1.1 km || 
|-id=853 bgcolor=#fefefe
| 371853 ||  || — || January 10, 2008 || Catalina || CSS || — || align=right data-sort-value="0.77" | 770 m || 
|-id=854 bgcolor=#fefefe
| 371854 ||  || — || January 10, 2008 || Catalina || CSS || V || align=right data-sort-value="0.82" | 820 m || 
|-id=855 bgcolor=#fefefe
| 371855 ||  || — || January 5, 2008 || Mayhill || W. G. Dillon, D. Wells || FLO || align=right data-sort-value="0.65" | 650 m || 
|-id=856 bgcolor=#fefefe
| 371856 ||  || — || January 10, 2008 || Catalina || CSS || — || align=right | 1.0 km || 
|-id=857 bgcolor=#fefefe
| 371857 ||  || — || January 11, 2008 || Kitt Peak || Spacewatch || — || align=right data-sort-value="0.71" | 710 m || 
|-id=858 bgcolor=#fefefe
| 371858 ||  || — || January 1, 2008 || Kitt Peak || Spacewatch || V || align=right data-sort-value="0.76" | 760 m || 
|-id=859 bgcolor=#fefefe
| 371859 ||  || — || December 15, 2007 || Mount Lemmon || Mount Lemmon Survey || FLO || align=right data-sort-value="0.62" | 620 m || 
|-id=860 bgcolor=#fefefe
| 371860 ||  || — || December 19, 2007 || Mount Lemmon || Mount Lemmon Survey || FLO || align=right data-sort-value="0.70" | 700 m || 
|-id=861 bgcolor=#fefefe
| 371861 ||  || — || December 31, 2007 || Kitt Peak || Spacewatch || — || align=right data-sort-value="0.70" | 700 m || 
|-id=862 bgcolor=#fefefe
| 371862 ||  || — || January 30, 2008 || Kitt Peak || Spacewatch || — || align=right data-sort-value="0.82" | 820 m || 
|-id=863 bgcolor=#fefefe
| 371863 ||  || — || December 31, 2007 || Mount Lemmon || Mount Lemmon Survey || NYS || align=right data-sort-value="0.76" | 760 m || 
|-id=864 bgcolor=#fefefe
| 371864 ||  || — || January 31, 2008 || Mount Lemmon || Mount Lemmon Survey || — || align=right | 1.0 km || 
|-id=865 bgcolor=#fefefe
| 371865 ||  || — || January 30, 2008 || Mount Lemmon || Mount Lemmon Survey || — || align=right data-sort-value="0.77" | 770 m || 
|-id=866 bgcolor=#fefefe
| 371866 ||  || — || February 2, 2008 || Mount Lemmon || Mount Lemmon Survey || — || align=right | 1.1 km || 
|-id=867 bgcolor=#fefefe
| 371867 ||  || — || December 31, 2007 || Kitt Peak || Spacewatch || NYS || align=right data-sort-value="0.68" | 680 m || 
|-id=868 bgcolor=#fefefe
| 371868 ||  || — || February 7, 2008 || Taunus || E. Schwab, U. Zimmer || NYS || align=right data-sort-value="0.61" | 610 m || 
|-id=869 bgcolor=#fefefe
| 371869 ||  || — || December 14, 2007 || Mount Lemmon || Mount Lemmon Survey || — || align=right data-sort-value="0.97" | 970 m || 
|-id=870 bgcolor=#fefefe
| 371870 ||  || — || February 1, 2008 || Kitt Peak || Spacewatch || — || align=right data-sort-value="0.77" | 770 m || 
|-id=871 bgcolor=#fefefe
| 371871 ||  || — || February 1, 2008 || Kitt Peak || Spacewatch || — || align=right data-sort-value="0.79" | 790 m || 
|-id=872 bgcolor=#fefefe
| 371872 ||  || — || February 1, 2008 || Kitt Peak || Spacewatch || — || align=right | 1.0 km || 
|-id=873 bgcolor=#fefefe
| 371873 ||  || — || January 19, 2008 || Kitt Peak || Spacewatch || NYS || align=right data-sort-value="0.68" | 680 m || 
|-id=874 bgcolor=#fefefe
| 371874 ||  || — || February 2, 2008 || Kitt Peak || Spacewatch || — || align=right data-sort-value="0.73" | 730 m || 
|-id=875 bgcolor=#fefefe
| 371875 ||  || — || February 2, 2008 || Kitt Peak || Spacewatch || NYS || align=right data-sort-value="0.70" | 700 m || 
|-id=876 bgcolor=#fefefe
| 371876 ||  || — || February 2, 2008 || Kitt Peak || Spacewatch || V || align=right data-sort-value="0.78" | 780 m || 
|-id=877 bgcolor=#fefefe
| 371877 ||  || — || February 2, 2008 || Kitt Peak || Spacewatch || — || align=right data-sort-value="0.85" | 850 m || 
|-id=878 bgcolor=#d6d6d6
| 371878 ||  || — || February 2, 2008 || Kitt Peak || Spacewatch || 3:2 || align=right | 5.2 km || 
|-id=879 bgcolor=#fefefe
| 371879 ||  || — || February 2, 2008 || Kitt Peak || Spacewatch || V || align=right data-sort-value="0.74" | 740 m || 
|-id=880 bgcolor=#fefefe
| 371880 ||  || — || February 3, 2008 || Kitt Peak || Spacewatch || — || align=right data-sort-value="0.74" | 740 m || 
|-id=881 bgcolor=#fefefe
| 371881 ||  || — || February 6, 2008 || Catalina || CSS || — || align=right | 1.2 km || 
|-id=882 bgcolor=#fefefe
| 371882 ||  || — || February 7, 2008 || Mount Lemmon || Mount Lemmon Survey || — || align=right data-sort-value="0.70" | 700 m || 
|-id=883 bgcolor=#fefefe
| 371883 ||  || — || February 7, 2008 || Catalina || CSS || — || align=right data-sort-value="0.77" | 770 m || 
|-id=884 bgcolor=#fefefe
| 371884 ||  || — || January 12, 2008 || Kitt Peak || Spacewatch || NYS || align=right data-sort-value="0.50" | 500 m || 
|-id=885 bgcolor=#fefefe
| 371885 ||  || — || February 2, 2008 || Socorro || LINEAR || — || align=right data-sort-value="0.86" | 860 m || 
|-id=886 bgcolor=#fefefe
| 371886 ||  || — || November 18, 2007 || Mount Lemmon || Mount Lemmon Survey || V || align=right data-sort-value="0.87" | 870 m || 
|-id=887 bgcolor=#fefefe
| 371887 ||  || — || December 31, 2007 || Mount Lemmon || Mount Lemmon Survey || — || align=right data-sort-value="0.87" | 870 m || 
|-id=888 bgcolor=#E9E9E9
| 371888 ||  || — || February 3, 2008 || Kitt Peak || Spacewatch || — || align=right | 1.7 km || 
|-id=889 bgcolor=#fefefe
| 371889 ||  || — || February 7, 2008 || Kitt Peak || Spacewatch || — || align=right | 1.0 km || 
|-id=890 bgcolor=#fefefe
| 371890 ||  || — || February 7, 2008 || Mount Lemmon || Mount Lemmon Survey || — || align=right data-sort-value="0.95" | 950 m || 
|-id=891 bgcolor=#fefefe
| 371891 ||  || — || April 12, 1994 || Kitt Peak || Spacewatch || V || align=right data-sort-value="0.62" | 620 m || 
|-id=892 bgcolor=#fefefe
| 371892 ||  || — || February 8, 2008 || Kitt Peak || Spacewatch || MAS || align=right data-sort-value="0.61" | 610 m || 
|-id=893 bgcolor=#fefefe
| 371893 ||  || — || February 9, 2008 || Kitt Peak || Spacewatch || — || align=right data-sort-value="0.83" | 830 m || 
|-id=894 bgcolor=#fefefe
| 371894 ||  || — || February 7, 2008 || Mount Lemmon || Mount Lemmon Survey || NYS || align=right data-sort-value="0.54" | 540 m || 
|-id=895 bgcolor=#fefefe
| 371895 ||  || — || February 7, 2008 || Mount Lemmon || Mount Lemmon Survey || MAS || align=right data-sort-value="0.70" | 700 m || 
|-id=896 bgcolor=#fefefe
| 371896 ||  || — || December 31, 2007 || Mount Lemmon || Mount Lemmon Survey || — || align=right data-sort-value="0.82" | 820 m || 
|-id=897 bgcolor=#E9E9E9
| 371897 ||  || — || February 8, 2008 || Kitt Peak || Spacewatch || — || align=right | 1.1 km || 
|-id=898 bgcolor=#fefefe
| 371898 ||  || — || February 8, 2008 || Kitt Peak || Spacewatch || — || align=right data-sort-value="0.77" | 770 m || 
|-id=899 bgcolor=#fefefe
| 371899 ||  || — || January 10, 2008 || Mount Lemmon || Mount Lemmon Survey || — || align=right data-sort-value="0.84" | 840 m || 
|-id=900 bgcolor=#fefefe
| 371900 ||  || — || February 8, 2008 || Kitt Peak || Spacewatch || — || align=right data-sort-value="0.88" | 880 m || 
|}

371901–372000 

|-bgcolor=#fefefe
| 371901 ||  || — || February 9, 2008 || Kitt Peak || Spacewatch || V || align=right data-sort-value="0.75" | 750 m || 
|-id=902 bgcolor=#fefefe
| 371902 ||  || — || February 9, 2008 || Kitt Peak || Spacewatch || — || align=right data-sort-value="0.68" | 680 m || 
|-id=903 bgcolor=#fefefe
| 371903 ||  || — || February 6, 2008 || Socorro || LINEAR || FLO || align=right data-sort-value="0.67" | 670 m || 
|-id=904 bgcolor=#fefefe
| 371904 ||  || — || February 11, 2008 || Mount Lemmon || Mount Lemmon Survey || V || align=right data-sort-value="0.68" | 680 m || 
|-id=905 bgcolor=#fefefe
| 371905 ||  || — || February 12, 2008 || Kitt Peak || Spacewatch || NYS || align=right data-sort-value="0.63" | 630 m || 
|-id=906 bgcolor=#fefefe
| 371906 ||  || — || February 8, 2008 || Kitt Peak || Spacewatch || V || align=right data-sort-value="0.56" | 560 m || 
|-id=907 bgcolor=#fefefe
| 371907 ||  || — || February 9, 2008 || Mount Lemmon || Mount Lemmon Survey || — || align=right data-sort-value="0.83" | 830 m || 
|-id=908 bgcolor=#E9E9E9
| 371908 ||  || — || February 27, 2008 || Catalina || CSS || — || align=right | 1.0 km || 
|-id=909 bgcolor=#fefefe
| 371909 ||  || — || February 28, 2008 || Catalina || CSS || — || align=right | 1.3 km || 
|-id=910 bgcolor=#fefefe
| 371910 ||  || — || January 11, 2008 || Mount Lemmon || Mount Lemmon Survey || MAS || align=right data-sort-value="0.76" | 760 m || 
|-id=911 bgcolor=#C2FFFF
| 371911 ||  || — || February 28, 2008 || Kitt Peak || Spacewatch || L5 || align=right | 13 km || 
|-id=912 bgcolor=#fefefe
| 371912 ||  || — || February 26, 2008 || Kitt Peak || Spacewatch || — || align=right data-sort-value="0.96" | 960 m || 
|-id=913 bgcolor=#fefefe
| 371913 ||  || — || February 26, 2008 || Kitt Peak || Spacewatch || — || align=right data-sort-value="0.72" | 720 m || 
|-id=914 bgcolor=#fefefe
| 371914 ||  || — || February 26, 2008 || Kitt Peak || Spacewatch || NYS || align=right data-sort-value="0.51" | 510 m || 
|-id=915 bgcolor=#fefefe
| 371915 ||  || — || February 26, 2008 || Kitt Peak || Spacewatch || — || align=right data-sort-value="0.79" | 790 m || 
|-id=916 bgcolor=#fefefe
| 371916 ||  || — || February 8, 2008 || Kitt Peak || Spacewatch || — || align=right | 1.1 km || 
|-id=917 bgcolor=#E9E9E9
| 371917 ||  || — || February 28, 2008 || Kitt Peak || Spacewatch || — || align=right | 1.4 km || 
|-id=918 bgcolor=#C2FFFF
| 371918 ||  || — || February 28, 2008 || Kitt Peak || Spacewatch || L5 || align=right | 10 km || 
|-id=919 bgcolor=#fefefe
| 371919 ||  || — || February 29, 2008 || Kitt Peak || Spacewatch || FLO || align=right data-sort-value="0.69" | 690 m || 
|-id=920 bgcolor=#E9E9E9
| 371920 ||  || — || February 18, 2008 || Mount Lemmon || Mount Lemmon Survey || — || align=right | 1.1 km || 
|-id=921 bgcolor=#fefefe
| 371921 ||  || — || March 1, 2008 || Kitt Peak || Spacewatch || — || align=right data-sort-value="0.76" | 760 m || 
|-id=922 bgcolor=#fefefe
| 371922 ||  || — || March 5, 2008 || Altschwendt || W. Ries || V || align=right data-sort-value="0.67" | 670 m || 
|-id=923 bgcolor=#fefefe
| 371923 ||  || — || March 1, 2008 || Kitt Peak || Spacewatch || — || align=right data-sort-value="0.80" | 800 m || 
|-id=924 bgcolor=#fefefe
| 371924 ||  || — || February 10, 2008 || Kitt Peak || Spacewatch || NYS || align=right data-sort-value="0.71" | 710 m || 
|-id=925 bgcolor=#E9E9E9
| 371925 ||  || — || March 1, 2008 || Kitt Peak || Spacewatch || — || align=right | 1.9 km || 
|-id=926 bgcolor=#fefefe
| 371926 ||  || — || March 1, 2008 || Kitt Peak || Spacewatch || V || align=right data-sort-value="0.75" | 750 m || 
|-id=927 bgcolor=#fefefe
| 371927 ||  || — || January 1, 2008 || Kitt Peak || Spacewatch || — || align=right data-sort-value="0.80" | 800 m || 
|-id=928 bgcolor=#fefefe
| 371928 ||  || — || February 8, 2008 || Mount Lemmon || Mount Lemmon Survey || V || align=right data-sort-value="0.65" | 650 m || 
|-id=929 bgcolor=#E9E9E9
| 371929 ||  || — || March 8, 2008 || Catalina || CSS || — || align=right | 1.1 km || 
|-id=930 bgcolor=#fefefe
| 371930 ||  || — || March 1, 2008 || Kitt Peak || Spacewatch || — || align=right | 1.1 km || 
|-id=931 bgcolor=#fefefe
| 371931 ||  || — || February 11, 2008 || Mount Lemmon || Mount Lemmon Survey || V || align=right data-sort-value="0.96" | 960 m || 
|-id=932 bgcolor=#fefefe
| 371932 ||  || — || March 5, 2008 || Mount Lemmon || Mount Lemmon Survey || — || align=right | 1.1 km || 
|-id=933 bgcolor=#fefefe
| 371933 ||  || — || March 7, 2008 || Kitt Peak || Spacewatch || V || align=right data-sort-value="0.63" | 630 m || 
|-id=934 bgcolor=#fefefe
| 371934 ||  || — || February 28, 2008 || Kitt Peak || Spacewatch || NYS || align=right data-sort-value="0.62" | 620 m || 
|-id=935 bgcolor=#fefefe
| 371935 ||  || — || March 8, 2008 || Mount Lemmon || Mount Lemmon Survey || — || align=right data-sort-value="0.95" | 950 m || 
|-id=936 bgcolor=#E9E9E9
| 371936 ||  || — || March 8, 2008 || Catalina || CSS || — || align=right | 1.1 km || 
|-id=937 bgcolor=#fefefe
| 371937 ||  || — || March 6, 2008 || Mount Lemmon || Mount Lemmon Survey || V || align=right data-sort-value="0.74" | 740 m || 
|-id=938 bgcolor=#fefefe
| 371938 ||  || — || March 7, 2008 || Mount Lemmon || Mount Lemmon Survey || NYS || align=right data-sort-value="0.68" | 680 m || 
|-id=939 bgcolor=#fefefe
| 371939 ||  || — || March 9, 2008 || Kitt Peak || Spacewatch || MAS || align=right data-sort-value="0.66" | 660 m || 
|-id=940 bgcolor=#fefefe
| 371940 ||  || — || March 11, 2008 || Kitt Peak || Spacewatch || NYS || align=right data-sort-value="0.76" | 760 m || 
|-id=941 bgcolor=#fefefe
| 371941 ||  || — || February 8, 2008 || Mount Lemmon || Mount Lemmon Survey || — || align=right data-sort-value="0.88" | 880 m || 
|-id=942 bgcolor=#fefefe
| 371942 ||  || — || March 11, 2008 || Mount Lemmon || Mount Lemmon Survey || — || align=right | 1.1 km || 
|-id=943 bgcolor=#E9E9E9
| 371943 ||  || — || March 11, 2008 || Kitt Peak || Spacewatch || IAN || align=right data-sort-value="0.97" | 970 m || 
|-id=944 bgcolor=#E9E9E9
| 371944 ||  || — || February 27, 2008 || Kitt Peak || Spacewatch || EUN || align=right | 1.2 km || 
|-id=945 bgcolor=#E9E9E9
| 371945 ||  || — || February 28, 2008 || Kitt Peak || Spacewatch || — || align=right data-sort-value="0.89" | 890 m || 
|-id=946 bgcolor=#E9E9E9
| 371946 ||  || — || March 2, 2008 || Kitt Peak || Spacewatch || — || align=right | 1.8 km || 
|-id=947 bgcolor=#fefefe
| 371947 ||  || — || March 5, 2008 || Kitt Peak || Spacewatch || V || align=right data-sort-value="0.59" | 590 m || 
|-id=948 bgcolor=#E9E9E9
| 371948 ||  || — || March 6, 2008 || Mount Lemmon || Mount Lemmon Survey || — || align=right | 1.5 km || 
|-id=949 bgcolor=#fefefe
| 371949 ||  || — || March 25, 2008 || Kitt Peak || Spacewatch || V || align=right data-sort-value="0.60" | 600 m || 
|-id=950 bgcolor=#E9E9E9
| 371950 ||  || — || March 30, 2008 || Grove Creek || F. Tozzi || — || align=right | 2.2 km || 
|-id=951 bgcolor=#E9E9E9
| 371951 ||  || — || February 27, 2008 || Mount Lemmon || Mount Lemmon Survey || — || align=right | 1.0 km || 
|-id=952 bgcolor=#fefefe
| 371952 ||  || — || March 27, 2008 || Kitt Peak || Spacewatch || — || align=right | 1.0 km || 
|-id=953 bgcolor=#E9E9E9
| 371953 ||  || — || March 28, 2008 || Mount Lemmon || Mount Lemmon Survey || — || align=right data-sort-value="0.82" | 820 m || 
|-id=954 bgcolor=#fefefe
| 371954 ||  || — || March 28, 2008 || Kitt Peak || Spacewatch || ERI || align=right | 1.6 km || 
|-id=955 bgcolor=#E9E9E9
| 371955 ||  || — || March 28, 2008 || Kitt Peak || Spacewatch || — || align=right | 1.5 km || 
|-id=956 bgcolor=#E9E9E9
| 371956 ||  || — || March 28, 2008 || Kitt Peak || Spacewatch || — || align=right data-sort-value="0.70" | 700 m || 
|-id=957 bgcolor=#fefefe
| 371957 ||  || — || March 28, 2008 || Mount Lemmon || Mount Lemmon Survey || NYS || align=right data-sort-value="0.57" | 570 m || 
|-id=958 bgcolor=#E9E9E9
| 371958 ||  || — || March 28, 2008 || Mount Lemmon || Mount Lemmon Survey || — || align=right data-sort-value="0.87" | 870 m || 
|-id=959 bgcolor=#E9E9E9
| 371959 ||  || — || March 28, 2008 || Kitt Peak || Spacewatch || — || align=right data-sort-value="0.79" | 790 m || 
|-id=960 bgcolor=#E9E9E9
| 371960 ||  || — || October 1, 2005 || Kitt Peak || Spacewatch || — || align=right data-sort-value="0.82" | 820 m || 
|-id=961 bgcolor=#E9E9E9
| 371961 ||  || — || March 28, 2008 || Mount Lemmon || Mount Lemmon Survey || — || align=right | 1.3 km || 
|-id=962 bgcolor=#E9E9E9
| 371962 ||  || — || March 28, 2008 || Kitt Peak || Spacewatch || JUN || align=right | 1.0 km || 
|-id=963 bgcolor=#E9E9E9
| 371963 ||  || — || March 30, 2008 || Kitt Peak || Spacewatch || — || align=right | 1.2 km || 
|-id=964 bgcolor=#E9E9E9
| 371964 ||  || — || March 30, 2008 || Kitt Peak || Spacewatch || — || align=right | 1.0 km || 
|-id=965 bgcolor=#E9E9E9
| 371965 ||  || — || March 30, 2008 || Kitt Peak || Spacewatch || — || align=right | 1.5 km || 
|-id=966 bgcolor=#E9E9E9
| 371966 ||  || — || March 31, 2008 || Kitt Peak || Spacewatch || — || align=right | 1.4 km || 
|-id=967 bgcolor=#E9E9E9
| 371967 ||  || — || March 31, 2008 || Mount Lemmon || Mount Lemmon Survey || — || align=right | 1.5 km || 
|-id=968 bgcolor=#E9E9E9
| 371968 ||  || — || March 29, 2008 || Kitt Peak || Spacewatch || — || align=right | 1.5 km || 
|-id=969 bgcolor=#fefefe
| 371969 ||  || — || March 29, 2008 || Kitt Peak || Spacewatch || — || align=right data-sort-value="0.94" | 940 m || 
|-id=970 bgcolor=#E9E9E9
| 371970 ||  || — || March 29, 2008 || Kitt Peak || Spacewatch || — || align=right data-sort-value="0.82" | 820 m || 
|-id=971 bgcolor=#E9E9E9
| 371971 ||  || — || March 30, 2008 || Kitt Peak || Spacewatch || KON || align=right | 1.9 km || 
|-id=972 bgcolor=#E9E9E9
| 371972 ||  || — || March 31, 2008 || Mount Lemmon || Mount Lemmon Survey || EUN || align=right | 1.4 km || 
|-id=973 bgcolor=#FFC2E0
| 371973 ||  || — || April 4, 2008 || Mount Lemmon || Mount Lemmon Survey || AMO || align=right data-sort-value="0.44" | 440 m || 
|-id=974 bgcolor=#fefefe
| 371974 ||  || — || January 11, 2008 || Mount Lemmon || Mount Lemmon Survey || NYS || align=right data-sort-value="0.73" | 730 m || 
|-id=975 bgcolor=#E9E9E9
| 371975 ||  || — || March 11, 2008 || Kitt Peak || Spacewatch || — || align=right | 1.6 km || 
|-id=976 bgcolor=#E9E9E9
| 371976 ||  || — || April 3, 2008 || Mount Lemmon || Mount Lemmon Survey || — || align=right | 1.5 km || 
|-id=977 bgcolor=#E9E9E9
| 371977 ||  || — || April 4, 2008 || Kitt Peak || Spacewatch || — || align=right | 1.3 km || 
|-id=978 bgcolor=#E9E9E9
| 371978 ||  || — || April 5, 2008 || Mount Lemmon || Mount Lemmon Survey || — || align=right | 1.0 km || 
|-id=979 bgcolor=#fefefe
| 371979 ||  || — || April 6, 2008 || Kitt Peak || Spacewatch || ERI || align=right | 1.5 km || 
|-id=980 bgcolor=#E9E9E9
| 371980 ||  || — || February 10, 2008 || Mount Lemmon || Mount Lemmon Survey || — || align=right | 1.8 km || 
|-id=981 bgcolor=#fefefe
| 371981 ||  || — || February 10, 2007 || Mount Lemmon || Mount Lemmon Survey || V || align=right data-sort-value="0.71" | 710 m || 
|-id=982 bgcolor=#E9E9E9
| 371982 ||  || — || April 6, 2008 || Catalina || CSS || — || align=right | 1.3 km || 
|-id=983 bgcolor=#fefefe
| 371983 ||  || — || April 8, 2008 || Kitt Peak || Spacewatch || — || align=right data-sort-value="0.85" | 850 m || 
|-id=984 bgcolor=#E9E9E9
| 371984 ||  || — || April 8, 2008 || Kitt Peak || Spacewatch || — || align=right data-sort-value="0.98" | 980 m || 
|-id=985 bgcolor=#E9E9E9
| 371985 ||  || — || April 9, 2008 || Kitt Peak || Spacewatch || — || align=right | 1.4 km || 
|-id=986 bgcolor=#E9E9E9
| 371986 ||  || — || April 11, 2008 || Kitt Peak || Spacewatch || — || align=right | 1.1 km || 
|-id=987 bgcolor=#E9E9E9
| 371987 ||  || — || March 4, 2008 || Mount Lemmon || Mount Lemmon Survey || — || align=right | 1.3 km || 
|-id=988 bgcolor=#E9E9E9
| 371988 ||  || — || December 20, 2007 || Mount Lemmon || Mount Lemmon Survey || BAR || align=right | 1.5 km || 
|-id=989 bgcolor=#E9E9E9
| 371989 ||  || — || April 11, 2008 || Socorro || LINEAR || — || align=right | 1.5 km || 
|-id=990 bgcolor=#fefefe
| 371990 ||  || — || April 14, 2004 || Kitt Peak || Spacewatch || — || align=right data-sort-value="0.89" | 890 m || 
|-id=991 bgcolor=#E9E9E9
| 371991 ||  || — || April 4, 2008 || Goodricke-Pigott || R. A. Tucker || EUN || align=right | 1.7 km || 
|-id=992 bgcolor=#E9E9E9
| 371992 ||  || — || April 3, 2008 || Kitt Peak || Spacewatch || EUN || align=right data-sort-value="0.95" | 950 m || 
|-id=993 bgcolor=#E9E9E9
| 371993 ||  || — || April 3, 2008 || Socorro || LINEAR || — || align=right | 2.2 km || 
|-id=994 bgcolor=#E9E9E9
| 371994 ||  || — || March 13, 2008 || Kitt Peak || Spacewatch || — || align=right data-sort-value="0.80" | 800 m || 
|-id=995 bgcolor=#E9E9E9
| 371995 ||  || — || February 27, 2008 || Kitt Peak || Spacewatch || — || align=right data-sort-value="0.87" | 870 m || 
|-id=996 bgcolor=#E9E9E9
| 371996 ||  || — || April 4, 2008 || Mount Lemmon || Mount Lemmon Survey || — || align=right | 2.0 km || 
|-id=997 bgcolor=#E9E9E9
| 371997 ||  || — || April 11, 2008 || Mount Lemmon || Mount Lemmon Survey || — || align=right data-sort-value="0.89" | 890 m || 
|-id=998 bgcolor=#E9E9E9
| 371998 ||  || — || April 25, 2008 || Kitt Peak || Spacewatch || — || align=right | 1.3 km || 
|-id=999 bgcolor=#E9E9E9
| 371999 ||  || — || April 26, 2008 || Kitt Peak || Spacewatch || — || align=right | 1.4 km || 
|-id=000 bgcolor=#E9E9E9
| 372000 ||  || — || April 9, 2008 || Kitt Peak || Spacewatch || — || align=right | 1.2 km || 
|}

References

External links 
 Discovery Circumstances: Numbered Minor Planets (370001)–(375000) (IAU Minor Planet Center)

0371